

44001–44100 

|-bgcolor=#d6d6d6
| 44001 Jonquet ||  ||  || September 6, 1997 || Pises || Pises Obs. || HYG || align=right | 6.6 km || 
|-id=002 bgcolor=#d6d6d6
| 44002 ||  || — || September 23, 1997 || Prescott || P. G. Comba || — || align=right | 4.9 km || 
|-id=003 bgcolor=#d6d6d6
| 44003 ||  || — || September 23, 1997 || Farra d'Isonzo || Farra d'Isonzo || — || align=right | 8.1 km || 
|-id=004 bgcolor=#fefefe
| 44004 ||  || — || September 25, 1997 || Rand || G. R. Viscome || — || align=right | 2.5 km || 
|-id=005 bgcolor=#d6d6d6
| 44005 Migliardi ||  ||  || September 25, 1997 || Pianoro || V. Goretti || EOS || align=right | 5.7 km || 
|-id=006 bgcolor=#fefefe
| 44006 ||  || — || October 6, 1997 || Nachi-Katsuura || Y. Shimizu, T. Urata || — || align=right | 3.3 km || 
|-id=007 bgcolor=#d6d6d6
| 44007 ||  || — || October 7, 1997 || Lake Clear || K. A. Williams || — || align=right | 8.6 km || 
|-id=008 bgcolor=#fefefe
| 44008 ||  || — || October 11, 1997 || Xinglong || SCAP || FLO || align=right | 2.4 km || 
|-id=009 bgcolor=#d6d6d6
| 44009 ||  || — || October 11, 1997 || Xinglong || SCAP || HYG || align=right | 7.4 km || 
|-id=010 bgcolor=#FA8072
| 44010 ||  || — || October 29, 1997 || Haleakala || NEAT || — || align=right | 4.2 km || 
|-id=011 bgcolor=#d6d6d6
| 44011 Juubichi ||  ||  || October 29, 1997 || Nanyo || T. Okuni || — || align=right | 7.7 km || 
|-id=012 bgcolor=#fefefe
| 44012 ||  || — || October 26, 1997 || Chichibu || N. Satō || — || align=right | 1.5 km || 
|-id=013 bgcolor=#E9E9E9
| 44013 Iidetenmomdai ||  ||  || November 1, 1997 || Nanyo || T. Okuni || — || align=right | 6.3 km || 
|-id=014 bgcolor=#E9E9E9
| 44014 ||  || — || November 19, 1997 || Oizumi || T. Kobayashi || — || align=right | 3.8 km || 
|-id=015 bgcolor=#d6d6d6
| 44015 ||  || — || November 21, 1997 || Kitt Peak || Spacewatch || KOR || align=right | 4.1 km || 
|-id=016 bgcolor=#E9E9E9
| 44016 Jimmypage ||  ||  || November 30, 1997 || Rolvenden || M. Armstrong, C. Armstrong || ADE || align=right | 9.5 km || 
|-id=017 bgcolor=#d6d6d6
| 44017 ||  || — || November 29, 1997 || Socorro || LINEAR || — || align=right | 8.5 km || 
|-id=018 bgcolor=#fefefe
| 44018 ||  || — || November 29, 1997 || Socorro || LINEAR || FLO || align=right | 2.7 km || 
|-id=019 bgcolor=#E9E9E9
| 44019 ||  || — || November 29, 1997 || Socorro || LINEAR || NEM || align=right | 5.7 km || 
|-id=020 bgcolor=#fefefe
| 44020 ||  || — || November 29, 1997 || Socorro || LINEAR || NYS || align=right | 4.0 km || 
|-id=021 bgcolor=#E9E9E9
| 44021 ||  || — || November 29, 1997 || Socorro || LINEAR || MAR || align=right | 3.6 km || 
|-id=022 bgcolor=#d6d6d6
| 44022 ||  || — || November 29, 1997 || Socorro || LINEAR || — || align=right | 4.6 km || 
|-id=023 bgcolor=#E9E9E9
| 44023 ||  || — || November 26, 1997 || Socorro || LINEAR || — || align=right | 5.6 km || 
|-id=024 bgcolor=#E9E9E9
| 44024 ||  || — || November 19, 1997 || Xinglong || SCAP || — || align=right | 3.4 km || 
|-id=025 bgcolor=#E9E9E9
| 44025 ||  || — || December 6, 1997 || Burlington || T. Handley || PAD || align=right | 6.4 km || 
|-id=026 bgcolor=#d6d6d6
| 44026 ||  || — || December 25, 1997 || Haleakala || NEAT || 7:4 || align=right | 11 km || 
|-id=027 bgcolor=#E9E9E9
| 44027 Termain || 1998 AD ||  || January 2, 1998 || Goodricke-Pigott || R. A. Tucker || JUN || align=right | 6.4 km || 
|-id=028 bgcolor=#E9E9E9
| 44028 ||  || — || January 19, 1998 || Oizumi || T. Kobayashi || EUN || align=right | 5.9 km || 
|-id=029 bgcolor=#fefefe
| 44029 ||  || — || January 21, 1998 || Nachi-Katsuura || Y. Shimizu, T. Urata || — || align=right | 2.0 km || 
|-id=030 bgcolor=#fefefe
| 44030 ||  || — || January 23, 1998 || Socorro || LINEAR || — || align=right | 2.3 km || 
|-id=031 bgcolor=#fefefe
| 44031 || 1998 CO || — || February 3, 1998 || Kleť || M. Tichý, Z. Moravec || — || align=right | 2.1 km || 
|-id=032 bgcolor=#fefefe
| 44032 ||  || — || February 6, 1998 || La Silla || E. W. Elst || FLO || align=right | 1.5 km || 
|-id=033 bgcolor=#fefefe
| 44033 Michez ||  ||  || February 15, 1998 || Bologna || San Vittore Obs. || — || align=right | 2.2 km || 
|-id=034 bgcolor=#fefefe
| 44034 || 1998 DB || — || February 17, 1998 || Oizumi || T. Kobayashi || — || align=right | 2.8 km || 
|-id=035 bgcolor=#fefefe
| 44035 ||  || — || February 22, 1998 || Haleakala || NEAT || — || align=right | 2.3 km || 
|-id=036 bgcolor=#fefefe
| 44036 ||  || — || February 22, 1998 || Kitt Peak || Spacewatch || — || align=right | 3.9 km || 
|-id=037 bgcolor=#fefefe
| 44037 ||  || — || February 23, 1998 || Kitt Peak || Spacewatch || FLO || align=right | 1.7 km || 
|-id=038 bgcolor=#fefefe
| 44038 ||  || — || February 21, 1998 || Kitt Peak || Spacewatch || FLO || align=right | 1.8 km || 
|-id=039 bgcolor=#fefefe
| 44039 de Sahagún ||  ||  || February 27, 1998 || La Silla || E. W. Elst || — || align=right | 2.3 km || 
|-id=040 bgcolor=#E9E9E9
| 44040 ||  || — || February 27, 1998 || La Silla || E. W. Elst || — || align=right | 2.5 km || 
|-id=041 bgcolor=#fefefe
| 44041 ||  || — || March 2, 1998 || Caussols || ODAS || — || align=right | 2.0 km || 
|-id=042 bgcolor=#fefefe
| 44042 ||  || — || March 2, 1998 || Xinglong || SCAP || — || align=right | 2.0 km || 
|-id=043 bgcolor=#fefefe
| 44043 ||  || — || March 1, 1998 || La Silla || E. W. Elst || FLO || align=right | 2.3 km || 
|-id=044 bgcolor=#fefefe
| 44044 ||  || — || March 1, 1998 || La Silla || E. W. Elst || ERI || align=right | 3.3 km || 
|-id=045 bgcolor=#fefefe
| 44045 ||  || — || March 1, 1998 || La Silla || E. W. Elst || — || align=right | 4.5 km || 
|-id=046 bgcolor=#fefefe
| 44046 ||  || — || March 21, 1998 || Kitt Peak || Spacewatch || — || align=right | 1.7 km || 
|-id=047 bgcolor=#fefefe
| 44047 ||  || — || March 20, 1998 || Socorro || LINEAR || H || align=right | 1.3 km || 
|-id=048 bgcolor=#fefefe
| 44048 ||  || — || March 21, 1998 || Kitt Peak || Spacewatch || V || align=right | 2.1 km || 
|-id=049 bgcolor=#fefefe
| 44049 ||  || — || March 21, 1998 || Kitt Peak || Spacewatch || — || align=right | 2.5 km || 
|-id=050 bgcolor=#fefefe
| 44050 ||  || — || March 24, 1998 || Haleakala || NEAT || — || align=right | 2.4 km || 
|-id=051 bgcolor=#fefefe
| 44051 ||  || — || March 26, 1998 || Haleakala || NEAT || — || align=right | 2.4 km || 
|-id=052 bgcolor=#fefefe
| 44052 ||  || — || March 28, 1998 || Caussols || ODAS || FLO || align=right | 2.2 km || 
|-id=053 bgcolor=#fefefe
| 44053 ||  || — || March 20, 1998 || Socorro || LINEAR || FLO || align=right | 2.3 km || 
|-id=054 bgcolor=#fefefe
| 44054 ||  || — || March 20, 1998 || Socorro || LINEAR || — || align=right | 1.5 km || 
|-id=055 bgcolor=#E9E9E9
| 44055 ||  || — || March 20, 1998 || Socorro || LINEAR || MAR || align=right | 4.6 km || 
|-id=056 bgcolor=#fefefe
| 44056 ||  || — || March 20, 1998 || Socorro || LINEAR || — || align=right | 1.9 km || 
|-id=057 bgcolor=#fefefe
| 44057 ||  || — || March 20, 1998 || Socorro || LINEAR || — || align=right | 2.0 km || 
|-id=058 bgcolor=#fefefe
| 44058 ||  || — || March 20, 1998 || Socorro || LINEAR || — || align=right | 1.8 km || 
|-id=059 bgcolor=#fefefe
| 44059 ||  || — || March 20, 1998 || Socorro || LINEAR || FLO || align=right | 2.2 km || 
|-id=060 bgcolor=#fefefe
| 44060 ||  || — || March 20, 1998 || Socorro || LINEAR || FLO || align=right | 2.8 km || 
|-id=061 bgcolor=#fefefe
| 44061 ||  || — || March 20, 1998 || Socorro || LINEAR || — || align=right | 2.4 km || 
|-id=062 bgcolor=#fefefe
| 44062 ||  || — || March 20, 1998 || Socorro || LINEAR || — || align=right | 2.4 km || 
|-id=063 bgcolor=#fefefe
| 44063 ||  || — || March 20, 1998 || Socorro || LINEAR || FLO || align=right | 2.2 km || 
|-id=064 bgcolor=#fefefe
| 44064 ||  || — || March 20, 1998 || Socorro || LINEAR || — || align=right | 2.2 km || 
|-id=065 bgcolor=#fefefe
| 44065 ||  || — || March 20, 1998 || Socorro || LINEAR || — || align=right | 2.2 km || 
|-id=066 bgcolor=#fefefe
| 44066 ||  || — || March 20, 1998 || Socorro || LINEAR || — || align=right | 2.1 km || 
|-id=067 bgcolor=#fefefe
| 44067 ||  || — || March 20, 1998 || Socorro || LINEAR || — || align=right | 3.6 km || 
|-id=068 bgcolor=#fefefe
| 44068 ||  || — || March 20, 1998 || Socorro || LINEAR || V || align=right | 2.3 km || 
|-id=069 bgcolor=#fefefe
| 44069 ||  || — || March 20, 1998 || Socorro || LINEAR || — || align=right | 2.0 km || 
|-id=070 bgcolor=#fefefe
| 44070 ||  || — || March 20, 1998 || Socorro || LINEAR || V || align=right | 2.1 km || 
|-id=071 bgcolor=#fefefe
| 44071 ||  || — || March 20, 1998 || Socorro || LINEAR || — || align=right | 3.0 km || 
|-id=072 bgcolor=#fefefe
| 44072 ||  || — || March 20, 1998 || Socorro || LINEAR || NYS || align=right | 2.1 km || 
|-id=073 bgcolor=#fefefe
| 44073 ||  || — || March 20, 1998 || Socorro || LINEAR || — || align=right | 2.2 km || 
|-id=074 bgcolor=#E9E9E9
| 44074 ||  || — || March 20, 1998 || Socorro || LINEAR || — || align=right | 3.6 km || 
|-id=075 bgcolor=#fefefe
| 44075 ||  || — || March 20, 1998 || Socorro || LINEAR || — || align=right | 2.4 km || 
|-id=076 bgcolor=#fefefe
| 44076 ||  || — || March 20, 1998 || Socorro || LINEAR || NYS || align=right | 1.7 km || 
|-id=077 bgcolor=#fefefe
| 44077 ||  || — || March 20, 1998 || Socorro || LINEAR || FLO || align=right | 1.9 km || 
|-id=078 bgcolor=#fefefe
| 44078 ||  || — || March 20, 1998 || Socorro || LINEAR || FLO || align=right | 1.4 km || 
|-id=079 bgcolor=#fefefe
| 44079 ||  || — || March 20, 1998 || Socorro || LINEAR || — || align=right | 1.7 km || 
|-id=080 bgcolor=#fefefe
| 44080 ||  || — || March 20, 1998 || Socorro || LINEAR || NYS || align=right | 1.4 km || 
|-id=081 bgcolor=#fefefe
| 44081 ||  || — || March 24, 1998 || Socorro || LINEAR || V || align=right | 2.3 km || 
|-id=082 bgcolor=#fefefe
| 44082 ||  || — || March 24, 1998 || Socorro || LINEAR || — || align=right | 2.7 km || 
|-id=083 bgcolor=#fefefe
| 44083 ||  || — || March 24, 1998 || Socorro || LINEAR || — || align=right | 2.5 km || 
|-id=084 bgcolor=#fefefe
| 44084 ||  || — || March 24, 1998 || Socorro || LINEAR || V || align=right | 2.1 km || 
|-id=085 bgcolor=#fefefe
| 44085 ||  || — || March 24, 1998 || Socorro || LINEAR || — || align=right | 2.3 km || 
|-id=086 bgcolor=#fefefe
| 44086 ||  || — || March 24, 1998 || Socorro || LINEAR || — || align=right | 2.5 km || 
|-id=087 bgcolor=#fefefe
| 44087 ||  || — || March 31, 1998 || Socorro || LINEAR || — || align=right | 2.7 km || 
|-id=088 bgcolor=#fefefe
| 44088 ||  || — || March 31, 1998 || Socorro || LINEAR || FLO || align=right | 1.6 km || 
|-id=089 bgcolor=#fefefe
| 44089 ||  || — || March 31, 1998 || Socorro || LINEAR || — || align=right | 2.2 km || 
|-id=090 bgcolor=#fefefe
| 44090 ||  || — || March 31, 1998 || Socorro || LINEAR || — || align=right | 1.8 km || 
|-id=091 bgcolor=#fefefe
| 44091 ||  || — || March 31, 1998 || Socorro || LINEAR || — || align=right | 1.7 km || 
|-id=092 bgcolor=#fefefe
| 44092 ||  || — || March 31, 1998 || Socorro || LINEAR || — || align=right | 2.1 km || 
|-id=093 bgcolor=#fefefe
| 44093 ||  || — || March 31, 1998 || Socorro || LINEAR || V || align=right | 1.7 km || 
|-id=094 bgcolor=#fefefe
| 44094 ||  || — || March 31, 1998 || Socorro || LINEAR || FLO || align=right | 2.2 km || 
|-id=095 bgcolor=#fefefe
| 44095 ||  || — || March 31, 1998 || Socorro || LINEAR || FLO || align=right | 3.4 km || 
|-id=096 bgcolor=#fefefe
| 44096 ||  || — || March 31, 1998 || Socorro || LINEAR || V || align=right | 2.2 km || 
|-id=097 bgcolor=#fefefe
| 44097 ||  || — || March 31, 1998 || Socorro || LINEAR || V || align=right | 3.0 km || 
|-id=098 bgcolor=#fefefe
| 44098 ||  || — || March 31, 1998 || Socorro || LINEAR || — || align=right | 2.6 km || 
|-id=099 bgcolor=#fefefe
| 44099 ||  || — || March 31, 1998 || Socorro || LINEAR || — || align=right | 2.1 km || 
|-id=100 bgcolor=#fefefe
| 44100 ||  || — || March 31, 1998 || Socorro || LINEAR || — || align=right | 3.2 km || 
|}

44101–44200 

|-bgcolor=#fefefe
| 44101 ||  || — || March 20, 1998 || Socorro || LINEAR || FLO || align=right | 3.0 km || 
|-id=102 bgcolor=#fefefe
| 44102 ||  || — || March 22, 1998 || Socorro || LINEAR || — || align=right | 1.5 km || 
|-id=103 bgcolor=#fefefe
| 44103 Aldana ||  ||  || April 4, 1998 || Teide || R. Casas || V || align=right | 2.2 km || 
|-id=104 bgcolor=#fefefe
| 44104 ||  || — || April 7, 1998 || Kleť || Kleť Obs. || — || align=right | 3.9 km || 
|-id=105 bgcolor=#fefefe
| 44105 ||  || — || April 1, 1998 || Socorro || LINEAR || FLO || align=right | 1.5 km || 
|-id=106 bgcolor=#fefefe
| 44106 ||  || — || April 19, 1998 || Kitt Peak || Spacewatch || — || align=right | 1.6 km || 
|-id=107 bgcolor=#fefefe
| 44107 ||  || — || April 21, 1998 || Kitt Peak || Spacewatch || V || align=right | 2.1 km || 
|-id=108 bgcolor=#fefefe
| 44108 ||  || — || April 20, 1998 || Višnjan Observatory || Višnjan Obs. || — || align=right | 3.6 km || 
|-id=109 bgcolor=#fefefe
| 44109 ||  || — || April 22, 1998 || Kitt Peak || Spacewatch || FLO || align=right | 2.1 km || 
|-id=110 bgcolor=#fefefe
| 44110 Cassegrain ||  ||  || April 21, 1998 || Caussols || ODAS || — || align=right | 1.9 km || 
|-id=111 bgcolor=#fefefe
| 44111 ||  || — || April 22, 1998 || Caussols || ODAS || NYS || align=right | 1.4 km || 
|-id=112 bgcolor=#fefefe
| 44112 ||  || — || April 18, 1998 || Socorro || LINEAR || FLO || align=right | 2.3 km || 
|-id=113 bgcolor=#fefefe
| 44113 ||  || — || April 29, 1998 || Haleakala || NEAT || FLO || align=right | 2.1 km || 
|-id=114 bgcolor=#fefefe
| 44114 ||  || — || April 20, 1998 || Socorro || LINEAR || — || align=right | 1.7 km || 
|-id=115 bgcolor=#fefefe
| 44115 ||  || — || April 28, 1998 || Prescott || P. G. Comba || — || align=right | 2.0 km || 
|-id=116 bgcolor=#fefefe
| 44116 ||  || — || April 20, 1998 || Kitt Peak || Spacewatch || — || align=right | 1.4 km || 
|-id=117 bgcolor=#fefefe
| 44117 Haroldlarson ||  ||  || April 21, 1998 || Kitt Peak || Spacewatch || — || align=right | 2.8 km || 
|-id=118 bgcolor=#fefefe
| 44118 ||  || — || April 25, 1998 || Haleakala || NEAT || — || align=right | 4.4 km || 
|-id=119 bgcolor=#fefefe
| 44119 ||  || — || April 20, 1998 || Socorro || LINEAR || V || align=right | 2.0 km || 
|-id=120 bgcolor=#fefefe
| 44120 ||  || — || April 20, 1998 || Socorro || LINEAR || — || align=right | 2.7 km || 
|-id=121 bgcolor=#fefefe
| 44121 ||  || — || April 20, 1998 || Socorro || LINEAR || FLO || align=right | 1.9 km || 
|-id=122 bgcolor=#fefefe
| 44122 ||  || — || April 20, 1998 || Socorro || LINEAR || FLO || align=right | 1.8 km || 
|-id=123 bgcolor=#fefefe
| 44123 ||  || — || April 20, 1998 || Socorro || LINEAR || — || align=right | 2.1 km || 
|-id=124 bgcolor=#fefefe
| 44124 ||  || — || April 20, 1998 || Socorro || LINEAR || — || align=right | 3.4 km || 
|-id=125 bgcolor=#fefefe
| 44125 ||  || — || April 20, 1998 || Socorro || LINEAR || FLO || align=right | 3.1 km || 
|-id=126 bgcolor=#fefefe
| 44126 ||  || — || April 20, 1998 || Socorro || LINEAR || V || align=right | 2.5 km || 
|-id=127 bgcolor=#fefefe
| 44127 ||  || — || April 20, 1998 || Socorro || LINEAR || V || align=right | 2.6 km || 
|-id=128 bgcolor=#fefefe
| 44128 ||  || — || April 25, 1998 || Anderson Mesa || LONEOS || — || align=right | 2.1 km || 
|-id=129 bgcolor=#fefefe
| 44129 ||  || — || April 25, 1998 || Anderson Mesa || LONEOS || FLO || align=right | 2.4 km || 
|-id=130 bgcolor=#fefefe
| 44130 ||  || — || April 30, 1998 || Anderson Mesa || LONEOS || — || align=right | 4.4 km || 
|-id=131 bgcolor=#fefefe
| 44131 ||  || — || April 21, 1998 || Socorro || LINEAR || — || align=right | 3.5 km || 
|-id=132 bgcolor=#fefefe
| 44132 ||  || — || April 21, 1998 || Socorro || LINEAR || — || align=right | 2.4 km || 
|-id=133 bgcolor=#fefefe
| 44133 ||  || — || April 21, 1998 || Socorro || LINEAR || FLO || align=right | 1.7 km || 
|-id=134 bgcolor=#fefefe
| 44134 ||  || — || April 21, 1998 || Socorro || LINEAR || NYS || align=right | 2.0 km || 
|-id=135 bgcolor=#fefefe
| 44135 ||  || — || April 21, 1998 || Socorro || LINEAR || FLO || align=right | 2.2 km || 
|-id=136 bgcolor=#fefefe
| 44136 ||  || — || April 21, 1998 || Socorro || LINEAR || — || align=right | 2.1 km || 
|-id=137 bgcolor=#E9E9E9
| 44137 ||  || — || April 21, 1998 || Socorro || LINEAR || — || align=right | 1.9 km || 
|-id=138 bgcolor=#fefefe
| 44138 ||  || — || April 21, 1998 || Socorro || LINEAR || — || align=right | 2.0 km || 
|-id=139 bgcolor=#fefefe
| 44139 ||  || — || April 21, 1998 || Socorro || LINEAR || — || align=right | 2.4 km || 
|-id=140 bgcolor=#fefefe
| 44140 ||  || — || April 21, 1998 || Socorro || LINEAR || — || align=right | 5.6 km || 
|-id=141 bgcolor=#fefefe
| 44141 ||  || — || April 21, 1998 || Socorro || LINEAR || — || align=right | 2.4 km || 
|-id=142 bgcolor=#fefefe
| 44142 ||  || — || April 21, 1998 || Socorro || LINEAR || — || align=right | 2.3 km || 
|-id=143 bgcolor=#fefefe
| 44143 ||  || — || April 21, 1998 || Socorro || LINEAR || FLO || align=right | 1.7 km || 
|-id=144 bgcolor=#fefefe
| 44144 ||  || — || April 21, 1998 || Socorro || LINEAR || FLO || align=right | 2.3 km || 
|-id=145 bgcolor=#fefefe
| 44145 ||  || — || April 21, 1998 || Socorro || LINEAR || — || align=right | 2.0 km || 
|-id=146 bgcolor=#fefefe
| 44146 ||  || — || April 25, 1998 || La Silla || E. W. Elst || V || align=right | 1.4 km || 
|-id=147 bgcolor=#fefefe
| 44147 ||  || — || April 25, 1998 || La Silla || E. W. Elst || V || align=right | 2.6 km || 
|-id=148 bgcolor=#fefefe
| 44148 ||  || — || April 23, 1998 || Socorro || LINEAR || FLO || align=right | 2.6 km || 
|-id=149 bgcolor=#fefefe
| 44149 ||  || — || April 23, 1998 || Socorro || LINEAR || — || align=right | 2.7 km || 
|-id=150 bgcolor=#fefefe
| 44150 ||  || — || April 23, 1998 || Socorro || LINEAR || — || align=right | 3.3 km || 
|-id=151 bgcolor=#fefefe
| 44151 ||  || — || April 23, 1998 || Socorro || LINEAR || FLO || align=right | 2.3 km || 
|-id=152 bgcolor=#fefefe
| 44152 ||  || — || April 23, 1998 || Socorro || LINEAR || — || align=right | 2.4 km || 
|-id=153 bgcolor=#fefefe
| 44153 ||  || — || April 23, 1998 || Socorro || LINEAR || V || align=right | 1.6 km || 
|-id=154 bgcolor=#E9E9E9
| 44154 ||  || — || April 23, 1998 || Socorro || LINEAR || — || align=right | 5.4 km || 
|-id=155 bgcolor=#fefefe
| 44155 ||  || — || April 23, 1998 || Socorro || LINEAR || FLO || align=right | 2.3 km || 
|-id=156 bgcolor=#fefefe
| 44156 ||  || — || April 23, 1998 || Socorro || LINEAR || — || align=right | 3.1 km || 
|-id=157 bgcolor=#fefefe
| 44157 ||  || — || April 23, 1998 || Socorro || LINEAR || — || align=right | 2.6 km || 
|-id=158 bgcolor=#fefefe
| 44158 ||  || — || April 19, 1998 || Socorro || LINEAR || — || align=right | 2.4 km || 
|-id=159 bgcolor=#E9E9E9
| 44159 ||  || — || April 19, 1998 || Socorro || LINEAR || — || align=right | 2.2 km || 
|-id=160 bgcolor=#fefefe
| 44160 ||  || — || April 19, 1998 || Socorro || LINEAR || FLO || align=right | 2.7 km || 
|-id=161 bgcolor=#fefefe
| 44161 ||  || — || April 21, 1998 || Socorro || LINEAR || — || align=right | 1.7 km || 
|-id=162 bgcolor=#fefefe
| 44162 ||  || — || April 25, 1998 || La Silla || E. W. Elst || V || align=right | 2.0 km || 
|-id=163 bgcolor=#fefefe
| 44163 ||  || — || April 25, 1998 || La Silla || E. W. Elst || — || align=right | 1.8 km || 
|-id=164 bgcolor=#fefefe
| 44164 || 1998 JS || — || May 1, 1998 || Haleakala || NEAT || FLO || align=right | 2.2 km || 
|-id=165 bgcolor=#fefefe
| 44165 ||  || — || May 1, 1998 || Haleakala || NEAT || — || align=right | 3.1 km || 
|-id=166 bgcolor=#fefefe
| 44166 ||  || — || May 1, 1998 || Haleakala || NEAT || FLO || align=right | 3.6 km || 
|-id=167 bgcolor=#fefefe
| 44167 ||  || — || May 1, 1998 || Anderson Mesa || LONEOS || — || align=right | 3.5 km || 
|-id=168 bgcolor=#FA8072
| 44168 ||  || — || May 15, 1998 || Woomera || F. B. Zoltowski || — || align=right | 2.7 km || 
|-id=169 bgcolor=#fefefe
| 44169 ||  || — || May 22, 1998 || Socorro || LINEAR || — || align=right | 4.5 km || 
|-id=170 bgcolor=#fefefe
| 44170 ||  || — || May 23, 1998 || Anderson Mesa || LONEOS || — || align=right | 4.1 km || 
|-id=171 bgcolor=#fefefe
| 44171 ||  || — || May 23, 1998 || Anderson Mesa || LONEOS || — || align=right | 2.6 km || 
|-id=172 bgcolor=#E9E9E9
| 44172 ||  || — || May 28, 1998 || Prescott || P. G. Comba || — || align=right | 5.0 km || 
|-id=173 bgcolor=#fefefe
| 44173 ||  || — || May 22, 1998 || Socorro || LINEAR || — || align=right | 2.1 km || 
|-id=174 bgcolor=#fefefe
| 44174 ||  || — || May 22, 1998 || Socorro || LINEAR || — || align=right | 2.3 km || 
|-id=175 bgcolor=#fefefe
| 44175 ||  || — || May 22, 1998 || Socorro || LINEAR || — || align=right | 3.5 km || 
|-id=176 bgcolor=#E9E9E9
| 44176 ||  || — || May 22, 1998 || Socorro || LINEAR || — || align=right | 2.1 km || 
|-id=177 bgcolor=#fefefe
| 44177 ||  || — || May 22, 1998 || Socorro || LINEAR || NYS || align=right | 2.2 km || 
|-id=178 bgcolor=#fefefe
| 44178 ||  || — || May 22, 1998 || Socorro || LINEAR || ERI || align=right | 5.5 km || 
|-id=179 bgcolor=#fefefe
| 44179 ||  || — || May 22, 1998 || Socorro || LINEAR || — || align=right | 2.3 km || 
|-id=180 bgcolor=#fefefe
| 44180 ||  || — || May 22, 1998 || Socorro || LINEAR || FLO || align=right | 3.2 km || 
|-id=181 bgcolor=#d6d6d6
| 44181 ||  || — || May 28, 1998 || Kitt Peak || Spacewatch || — || align=right | 7.3 km || 
|-id=182 bgcolor=#fefefe
| 44182 ||  || — || May 22, 1998 || Socorro || LINEAR || — || align=right | 4.0 km || 
|-id=183 bgcolor=#fefefe
| 44183 ||  || — || May 22, 1998 || Socorro || LINEAR || — || align=right | 3.3 km || 
|-id=184 bgcolor=#fefefe
| 44184 ||  || — || May 22, 1998 || Socorro || LINEAR || NYS || align=right | 4.3 km || 
|-id=185 bgcolor=#fefefe
| 44185 ||  || — || May 23, 1998 || Socorro || LINEAR || — || align=right | 3.4 km || 
|-id=186 bgcolor=#fefefe
| 44186 ||  || — || May 23, 1998 || Socorro || LINEAR || — || align=right | 2.8 km || 
|-id=187 bgcolor=#fefefe
| 44187 ||  || — || May 23, 1998 || Socorro || LINEAR || — || align=right | 4.8 km || 
|-id=188 bgcolor=#fefefe
| 44188 ||  || — || May 21, 1998 || Reedy Creek || J. Broughton || — || align=right | 2.4 km || 
|-id=189 bgcolor=#fefefe
| 44189 ||  || — || May 24, 1998 || Socorro || LINEAR || NYS || align=right | 1.7 km || 
|-id=190 bgcolor=#fefefe
| 44190 ||  || — || May 22, 1998 || Socorro || LINEAR || — || align=right | 2.7 km || 
|-id=191 bgcolor=#fefefe
| 44191 ||  || — || June 1, 1998 || La Silla || E. W. Elst || — || align=right | 4.0 km || 
|-id=192 bgcolor=#E9E9E9
| 44192 Paulguttman ||  ||  || June 18, 1998 || Mount Hopkins || C. W. Hergenrother || — || align=right | 2.8 km || 
|-id=193 bgcolor=#fefefe
| 44193 ||  || — || June 16, 1998 || Kitt Peak || Spacewatch || V || align=right | 1.5 km || 
|-id=194 bgcolor=#E9E9E9
| 44194 ||  || — || June 19, 1998 || Caussols || ODAS || MAR || align=right | 2.3 km || 
|-id=195 bgcolor=#E9E9E9
| 44195 ||  || — || June 19, 1998 || Anderson Mesa || LONEOS || — || align=right | 2.4 km || 
|-id=196 bgcolor=#fefefe
| 44196 ||  || — || June 19, 1998 || Socorro || LINEAR || V || align=right | 1.9 km || 
|-id=197 bgcolor=#E9E9E9
| 44197 ||  || — || June 17, 1998 || Kitt Peak || Spacewatch || EUN || align=right | 4.7 km || 
|-id=198 bgcolor=#E9E9E9
| 44198 ||  || — || June 25, 1998 || Woomera || F. B. Zoltowski || — || align=right | 2.8 km || 
|-id=199 bgcolor=#E9E9E9
| 44199 ||  || — || June 23, 1998 || Socorro || LINEAR || — || align=right | 3.4 km || 
|-id=200 bgcolor=#FA8072
| 44200 ||  || — || June 24, 1998 || Socorro || LINEAR || — || align=right | 2.9 km || 
|}

44201–44300 

|-bgcolor=#E9E9E9
| 44201 ||  || — || June 24, 1998 || Socorro || LINEAR || — || align=right | 9.1 km || 
|-id=202 bgcolor=#fefefe
| 44202 ||  || — || June 24, 1998 || Socorro || LINEAR || — || align=right | 3.6 km || 
|-id=203 bgcolor=#fefefe
| 44203 ||  || — || June 24, 1998 || Socorro || LINEAR || — || align=right | 4.9 km || 
|-id=204 bgcolor=#E9E9E9
| 44204 ||  || — || June 24, 1998 || Socorro || LINEAR || — || align=right | 3.8 km || 
|-id=205 bgcolor=#fefefe
| 44205 ||  || — || June 24, 1998 || Socorro || LINEAR || — || align=right | 2.7 km || 
|-id=206 bgcolor=#E9E9E9
| 44206 || 1998 OM || — || July 17, 1998 || Anderson Mesa || LONEOS || — || align=right | 3.9 km || 
|-id=207 bgcolor=#E9E9E9
| 44207 ||  || — || July 21, 1998 || Farra d'Isonzo || Farra d'Isonzo || EUN || align=right | 3.0 km || 
|-id=208 bgcolor=#E9E9E9
| 44208 ||  || — || July 20, 1998 || Xinglong || SCAP || — || align=right | 4.4 km || 
|-id=209 bgcolor=#E9E9E9
| 44209 ||  || — || July 28, 1998 || Xinglong || SCAP || GEF || align=right | 3.9 km || 
|-id=210 bgcolor=#E9E9E9
| 44210 ||  || — || July 26, 1998 || La Silla || E. W. Elst || — || align=right | 5.4 km || 
|-id=211 bgcolor=#E9E9E9
| 44211 ||  || — || July 23, 1998 || Reedy Creek || J. Broughton || — || align=right | 2.3 km || 
|-id=212 bgcolor=#E9E9E9
| 44212 ||  || — || July 29, 1998 || Reedy Creek || J. Broughton || — || align=right | 2.4 km || 
|-id=213 bgcolor=#E9E9E9
| 44213 ||  || — || July 26, 1998 || La Silla || E. W. Elst || EUN || align=right | 3.5 km || 
|-id=214 bgcolor=#E9E9E9
| 44214 ||  || — || July 26, 1998 || La Silla || E. W. Elst || — || align=right | 5.0 km || 
|-id=215 bgcolor=#E9E9E9
| 44215 ||  || — || July 26, 1998 || La Silla || E. W. Elst || — || align=right | 5.3 km || 
|-id=216 bgcolor=#E9E9E9
| 44216 Olivercabasa || 1998 PH ||  || August 4, 1998 || Teide || E. Vigil, F. Casarramona || — || align=right | 4.9 km || 
|-id=217 bgcolor=#E9E9E9
| 44217 Whittle ||  ||  || August 12, 1998 || Reedy Creek || J. Broughton || MAR || align=right | 8.0 km || 
|-id=218 bgcolor=#E9E9E9
| 44218 ||  || — || August 17, 1998 || Višnjan Observatory || Višnjan Obs. || — || align=right | 6.2 km || 
|-id=219 bgcolor=#E9E9E9
| 44219 ||  || — || August 17, 1998 || Socorro || LINEAR || — || align=right | 7.1 km || 
|-id=220 bgcolor=#fefefe
| 44220 ||  || — || August 17, 1998 || Socorro || LINEAR || — || align=right | 4.7 km || 
|-id=221 bgcolor=#E9E9E9
| 44221 ||  || — || August 17, 1998 || Socorro || LINEAR || — || align=right | 4.4 km || 
|-id=222 bgcolor=#E9E9E9
| 44222 ||  || — || August 17, 1998 || Socorro || LINEAR || GEF || align=right | 4.7 km || 
|-id=223 bgcolor=#E9E9E9
| 44223 ||  || — || August 17, 1998 || Socorro || LINEAR || — || align=right | 4.1 km || 
|-id=224 bgcolor=#fefefe
| 44224 ||  || — || August 17, 1998 || Socorro || LINEAR || — || align=right | 7.3 km || 
|-id=225 bgcolor=#E9E9E9
| 44225 ||  || — || August 17, 1998 || Socorro || LINEAR || — || align=right | 2.9 km || 
|-id=226 bgcolor=#E9E9E9
| 44226 ||  || — || August 17, 1998 || Socorro || LINEAR || — || align=right | 4.7 km || 
|-id=227 bgcolor=#fefefe
| 44227 ||  || — || August 17, 1998 || Socorro || LINEAR || CIM || align=right | 6.8 km || 
|-id=228 bgcolor=#E9E9E9
| 44228 ||  || — || August 17, 1998 || Socorro || LINEAR || — || align=right | 3.2 km || 
|-id=229 bgcolor=#E9E9E9
| 44229 ||  || — || August 17, 1998 || Socorro || LINEAR || — || align=right | 4.4 km || 
|-id=230 bgcolor=#E9E9E9
| 44230 ||  || — || August 17, 1998 || Socorro || LINEAR || — || align=right | 5.7 km || 
|-id=231 bgcolor=#E9E9E9
| 44231 ||  || — || August 17, 1998 || Socorro || LINEAR || — || align=right | 2.5 km || 
|-id=232 bgcolor=#E9E9E9
| 44232 ||  || — || August 25, 1998 || Socorro || LINEAR || PAL || align=right | 9.7 km || 
|-id=233 bgcolor=#E9E9E9
| 44233 ||  || — || August 26, 1998 || Prescott || P. G. Comba || — || align=right | 4.9 km || 
|-id=234 bgcolor=#E9E9E9
| 44234 ||  || — || August 26, 1998 || Ondřejov || L. Kotková || EUN || align=right | 5.3 km || 
|-id=235 bgcolor=#fefefe
| 44235 ||  || — || August 17, 1998 || Socorro || LINEAR || — || align=right | 3.5 km || 
|-id=236 bgcolor=#E9E9E9
| 44236 ||  || — || August 17, 1998 || Socorro || LINEAR || — || align=right | 2.5 km || 
|-id=237 bgcolor=#E9E9E9
| 44237 ||  || — || August 17, 1998 || Socorro || LINEAR || — || align=right | 4.1 km || 
|-id=238 bgcolor=#fefefe
| 44238 ||  || — || August 17, 1998 || Socorro || LINEAR || NYS || align=right | 2.2 km || 
|-id=239 bgcolor=#E9E9E9
| 44239 ||  || — || August 17, 1998 || Socorro || LINEAR || — || align=right | 2.3 km || 
|-id=240 bgcolor=#E9E9E9
| 44240 ||  || — || August 17, 1998 || Socorro || LINEAR || EUN || align=right | 5.5 km || 
|-id=241 bgcolor=#E9E9E9
| 44241 ||  || — || August 17, 1998 || Socorro || LINEAR || GEF || align=right | 5.0 km || 
|-id=242 bgcolor=#E9E9E9
| 44242 ||  || — || August 17, 1998 || Socorro || LINEAR || — || align=right | 2.8 km || 
|-id=243 bgcolor=#E9E9E9
| 44243 ||  || — || August 17, 1998 || Socorro || LINEAR || — || align=right | 3.0 km || 
|-id=244 bgcolor=#E9E9E9
| 44244 ||  || — || August 17, 1998 || Socorro || LINEAR || — || align=right | 5.4 km || 
|-id=245 bgcolor=#E9E9E9
| 44245 ||  || — || August 17, 1998 || Socorro || LINEAR || — || align=right | 5.6 km || 
|-id=246 bgcolor=#E9E9E9
| 44246 ||  || — || August 17, 1998 || Socorro || LINEAR || — || align=right | 4.5 km || 
|-id=247 bgcolor=#E9E9E9
| 44247 ||  || — || August 17, 1998 || Socorro || LINEAR || NEM || align=right | 7.0 km || 
|-id=248 bgcolor=#E9E9E9
| 44248 ||  || — || August 17, 1998 || Socorro || LINEAR || — || align=right | 4.0 km || 
|-id=249 bgcolor=#E9E9E9
| 44249 ||  || — || August 17, 1998 || Socorro || LINEAR || MAR || align=right | 6.5 km || 
|-id=250 bgcolor=#E9E9E9
| 44250 ||  || — || August 17, 1998 || Socorro || LINEAR || — || align=right | 3.0 km || 
|-id=251 bgcolor=#d6d6d6
| 44251 ||  || — || August 17, 1998 || Socorro || LINEAR || KOR || align=right | 4.0 km || 
|-id=252 bgcolor=#E9E9E9
| 44252 ||  || — || August 17, 1998 || Socorro || LINEAR || — || align=right | 3.2 km || 
|-id=253 bgcolor=#d6d6d6
| 44253 ||  || — || August 17, 1998 || Socorro || LINEAR || KOR || align=right | 4.2 km || 
|-id=254 bgcolor=#E9E9E9
| 44254 ||  || — || August 17, 1998 || Socorro || LINEAR || — || align=right | 5.6 km || 
|-id=255 bgcolor=#E9E9E9
| 44255 ||  || — || August 17, 1998 || Socorro || LINEAR || — || align=right | 5.2 km || 
|-id=256 bgcolor=#E9E9E9
| 44256 ||  || — || August 17, 1998 || Socorro || LINEAR || RAF || align=right | 2.7 km || 
|-id=257 bgcolor=#E9E9E9
| 44257 ||  || — || August 17, 1998 || Socorro || LINEAR || HNS || align=right | 4.6 km || 
|-id=258 bgcolor=#E9E9E9
| 44258 ||  || — || August 17, 1998 || Socorro || LINEAR || EUN || align=right | 5.0 km || 
|-id=259 bgcolor=#E9E9E9
| 44259 ||  || — || August 17, 1998 || Socorro || LINEAR || EUN || align=right | 4.5 km || 
|-id=260 bgcolor=#E9E9E9
| 44260 ||  || — || August 17, 1998 || Socorro || LINEAR || — || align=right | 3.6 km || 
|-id=261 bgcolor=#d6d6d6
| 44261 ||  || — || August 17, 1998 || Socorro || LINEAR || — || align=right | 7.7 km || 
|-id=262 bgcolor=#fefefe
| 44262 ||  || — || August 17, 1998 || Socorro || LINEAR || PHO || align=right | 4.9 km || 
|-id=263 bgcolor=#E9E9E9
| 44263 Nansouty ||  ||  || August 28, 1998 || Dax || P. Dupouy, F. Maréchal || GEF || align=right | 4.0 km || 
|-id=264 bgcolor=#E9E9E9
| 44264 ||  || — || August 27, 1998 || Anderson Mesa || LONEOS || — || align=right | 3.6 km || 
|-id=265 bgcolor=#E9E9E9
| 44265 ||  || — || August 27, 1998 || Anderson Mesa || LONEOS || — || align=right | 3.1 km || 
|-id=266 bgcolor=#E9E9E9
| 44266 ||  || — || August 26, 1998 || Višnjan Observatory || Višnjan Obs. || — || align=right | 2.8 km || 
|-id=267 bgcolor=#E9E9E9
| 44267 ||  || — || August 29, 1998 || Višnjan Observatory || Višnjan Obs. || — || align=right | 4.3 km || 
|-id=268 bgcolor=#E9E9E9
| 44268 ||  || — || August 23, 1998 || Anderson Mesa || LONEOS || — || align=right | 3.9 km || 
|-id=269 bgcolor=#E9E9E9
| 44269 ||  || — || August 23, 1998 || Anderson Mesa || LONEOS || MAR || align=right | 3.4 km || 
|-id=270 bgcolor=#E9E9E9
| 44270 ||  || — || August 24, 1998 || Socorro || LINEAR || — || align=right | 3.0 km || 
|-id=271 bgcolor=#E9E9E9
| 44271 ||  || — || August 24, 1998 || Socorro || LINEAR || — || align=right | 4.5 km || 
|-id=272 bgcolor=#E9E9E9
| 44272 ||  || — || August 24, 1998 || Socorro || LINEAR || AER || align=right | 2.9 km || 
|-id=273 bgcolor=#E9E9E9
| 44273 ||  || — || August 24, 1998 || Socorro || LINEAR || — || align=right | 3.4 km || 
|-id=274 bgcolor=#E9E9E9
| 44274 ||  || — || August 24, 1998 || Socorro || LINEAR || — || align=right | 2.5 km || 
|-id=275 bgcolor=#E9E9E9
| 44275 ||  || — || August 24, 1998 || Socorro || LINEAR || EUN || align=right | 3.4 km || 
|-id=276 bgcolor=#E9E9E9
| 44276 ||  || — || August 24, 1998 || Socorro || LINEAR || HNS || align=right | 3.1 km || 
|-id=277 bgcolor=#E9E9E9
| 44277 ||  || — || August 24, 1998 || Socorro || LINEAR || — || align=right | 4.1 km || 
|-id=278 bgcolor=#fefefe
| 44278 ||  || — || August 24, 1998 || Socorro || LINEAR || — || align=right | 3.1 km || 
|-id=279 bgcolor=#E9E9E9
| 44279 ||  || — || August 24, 1998 || Socorro || LINEAR || EUN || align=right | 2.6 km || 
|-id=280 bgcolor=#E9E9E9
| 44280 ||  || — || August 24, 1998 || Socorro || LINEAR || — || align=right | 7.3 km || 
|-id=281 bgcolor=#E9E9E9
| 44281 ||  || — || August 24, 1998 || Socorro || LINEAR || — || align=right | 4.8 km || 
|-id=282 bgcolor=#E9E9E9
| 44282 ||  || — || August 24, 1998 || Socorro || LINEAR || — || align=right | 3.5 km || 
|-id=283 bgcolor=#E9E9E9
| 44283 ||  || — || August 24, 1998 || Socorro || LINEAR || MAR || align=right | 4.7 km || 
|-id=284 bgcolor=#E9E9E9
| 44284 ||  || — || August 24, 1998 || Socorro || LINEAR || — || align=right | 4.7 km || 
|-id=285 bgcolor=#E9E9E9
| 44285 ||  || — || August 24, 1998 || Socorro || LINEAR || — || align=right | 4.1 km || 
|-id=286 bgcolor=#E9E9E9
| 44286 ||  || — || August 24, 1998 || Socorro || LINEAR || — || align=right | 4.0 km || 
|-id=287 bgcolor=#E9E9E9
| 44287 ||  || — || August 24, 1998 || Socorro || LINEAR || EUN || align=right | 4.3 km || 
|-id=288 bgcolor=#d6d6d6
| 44288 ||  || — || August 24, 1998 || Socorro || LINEAR || EOS || align=right | 4.3 km || 
|-id=289 bgcolor=#E9E9E9
| 44289 ||  || — || August 24, 1998 || Socorro || LINEAR || — || align=right | 3.5 km || 
|-id=290 bgcolor=#E9E9E9
| 44290 ||  || — || August 24, 1998 || Socorro || LINEAR || — || align=right | 4.7 km || 
|-id=291 bgcolor=#E9E9E9
| 44291 ||  || — || August 24, 1998 || Socorro || LINEAR || — || align=right | 3.9 km || 
|-id=292 bgcolor=#d6d6d6
| 44292 ||  || — || August 24, 1998 || Socorro || LINEAR || — || align=right | 5.6 km || 
|-id=293 bgcolor=#E9E9E9
| 44293 ||  || — || August 24, 1998 || Socorro || LINEAR || MAR || align=right | 3.4 km || 
|-id=294 bgcolor=#E9E9E9
| 44294 ||  || — || August 24, 1998 || Socorro || LINEAR || ADE || align=right | 7.6 km || 
|-id=295 bgcolor=#d6d6d6
| 44295 ||  || — || August 24, 1998 || Socorro || LINEAR || EOS || align=right | 9.4 km || 
|-id=296 bgcolor=#fefefe
| 44296 ||  || — || August 24, 1998 || Socorro || LINEAR || — || align=right | 4.3 km || 
|-id=297 bgcolor=#E9E9E9
| 44297 ||  || — || August 28, 1998 || Socorro || LINEAR || — || align=right | 4.7 km || 
|-id=298 bgcolor=#E9E9E9
| 44298 ||  || — || August 17, 1998 || Socorro || LINEAR || MAR || align=right | 5.1 km || 
|-id=299 bgcolor=#E9E9E9
| 44299 ||  || — || August 19, 1998 || Socorro || LINEAR || — || align=right | 3.8 km || 
|-id=300 bgcolor=#E9E9E9
| 44300 ||  || — || August 19, 1998 || Socorro || LINEAR || — || align=right | 5.9 km || 
|}

44301–44400 

|-bgcolor=#E9E9E9
| 44301 ||  || — || August 19, 1998 || Socorro || LINEAR || — || align=right | 4.2 km || 
|-id=302 bgcolor=#E9E9E9
| 44302 ||  || — || August 26, 1998 || La Silla || E. W. Elst || — || align=right | 3.5 km || 
|-id=303 bgcolor=#E9E9E9
| 44303 ||  || — || August 26, 1998 || La Silla || E. W. Elst || — || align=right | 1.9 km || 
|-id=304 bgcolor=#d6d6d6
| 44304 ||  || — || August 26, 1998 || La Silla || E. W. Elst || — || align=right | 5.9 km || 
|-id=305 bgcolor=#E9E9E9
| 44305 ||  || — || August 26, 1998 || La Silla || E. W. Elst || — || align=right | 3.3 km || 
|-id=306 bgcolor=#E9E9E9
| 44306 ||  || — || August 26, 1998 || La Silla || E. W. Elst || — || align=right | 4.1 km || 
|-id=307 bgcolor=#E9E9E9
| 44307 ||  || — || August 25, 1998 || La Silla || E. W. Elst || EUN || align=right | 4.3 km || 
|-id=308 bgcolor=#E9E9E9
| 44308 || 1998 RG || — || September 1, 1998 || Woomera || F. B. Zoltowski || GEF || align=right | 3.8 km || 
|-id=309 bgcolor=#E9E9E9
| 44309 || 1998 RT || — || September 9, 1998 || Farra d'Isonzo || Farra d'Isonzo || — || align=right | 3.1 km || 
|-id=310 bgcolor=#E9E9E9
| 44310 ||  || — || September 14, 1998 || Catalina || CSS || EUN || align=right | 3.5 km || 
|-id=311 bgcolor=#E9E9E9
| 44311 ||  || — || September 15, 1998 || Anderson Mesa || LONEOS || — || align=right | 3.9 km || 
|-id=312 bgcolor=#E9E9E9
| 44312 ||  || — || September 12, 1998 || Kitt Peak || Spacewatch || — || align=right | 5.8 km || 
|-id=313 bgcolor=#E9E9E9
| 44313 ||  || — || September 14, 1998 || Kitt Peak || Spacewatch || WIT || align=right | 3.4 km || 
|-id=314 bgcolor=#E9E9E9
| 44314 ||  || — || September 4, 1998 || Xinglong || SCAP || EUN || align=right | 3.6 km || 
|-id=315 bgcolor=#E9E9E9
| 44315 ||  || — || September 14, 1998 || Xinglong || SCAP || — || align=right | 4.5 km || 
|-id=316 bgcolor=#E9E9E9
| 44316 ||  || — || September 14, 1998 || Socorro || LINEAR || — || align=right | 3.2 km || 
|-id=317 bgcolor=#E9E9E9
| 44317 ||  || — || September 14, 1998 || Socorro || LINEAR || EUN || align=right | 3.1 km || 
|-id=318 bgcolor=#E9E9E9
| 44318 ||  || — || September 14, 1998 || Socorro || LINEAR || — || align=right | 3.1 km || 
|-id=319 bgcolor=#E9E9E9
| 44319 ||  || — || September 14, 1998 || Socorro || LINEAR || — || align=right | 3.2 km || 
|-id=320 bgcolor=#E9E9E9
| 44320 ||  || — || September 14, 1998 || Socorro || LINEAR || EUN || align=right | 5.0 km || 
|-id=321 bgcolor=#E9E9E9
| 44321 ||  || — || September 14, 1998 || Socorro || LINEAR || HNS || align=right | 3.6 km || 
|-id=322 bgcolor=#E9E9E9
| 44322 ||  || — || September 14, 1998 || Socorro || LINEAR || — || align=right | 2.2 km || 
|-id=323 bgcolor=#E9E9E9
| 44323 ||  || — || September 14, 1998 || Socorro || LINEAR || EUN || align=right | 4.9 km || 
|-id=324 bgcolor=#E9E9E9
| 44324 ||  || — || September 14, 1998 || Socorro || LINEAR || — || align=right | 8.6 km || 
|-id=325 bgcolor=#E9E9E9
| 44325 ||  || — || September 14, 1998 || Socorro || LINEAR || HOF || align=right | 7.5 km || 
|-id=326 bgcolor=#E9E9E9
| 44326 ||  || — || September 14, 1998 || Socorro || LINEAR || — || align=right | 2.1 km || 
|-id=327 bgcolor=#E9E9E9
| 44327 ||  || — || September 14, 1998 || Socorro || LINEAR || — || align=right | 2.6 km || 
|-id=328 bgcolor=#E9E9E9
| 44328 ||  || — || September 14, 1998 || Socorro || LINEAR || — || align=right | 5.7 km || 
|-id=329 bgcolor=#E9E9E9
| 44329 ||  || — || September 14, 1998 || Socorro || LINEAR || — || align=right | 4.9 km || 
|-id=330 bgcolor=#E9E9E9
| 44330 ||  || — || September 14, 1998 || Socorro || LINEAR || HEN || align=right | 2.6 km || 
|-id=331 bgcolor=#E9E9E9
| 44331 ||  || — || September 14, 1998 || Socorro || LINEAR || EUN || align=right | 3.6 km || 
|-id=332 bgcolor=#E9E9E9
| 44332 ||  || — || September 14, 1998 || Socorro || LINEAR || — || align=right | 3.4 km || 
|-id=333 bgcolor=#E9E9E9
| 44333 ||  || — || September 14, 1998 || Socorro || LINEAR || ADE || align=right | 6.3 km || 
|-id=334 bgcolor=#E9E9E9
| 44334 ||  || — || September 14, 1998 || Socorro || LINEAR || — || align=right | 4.8 km || 
|-id=335 bgcolor=#E9E9E9
| 44335 ||  || — || September 14, 1998 || Socorro || LINEAR || — || align=right | 3.5 km || 
|-id=336 bgcolor=#E9E9E9
| 44336 ||  || — || September 14, 1998 || Socorro || LINEAR || — || align=right | 3.0 km || 
|-id=337 bgcolor=#E9E9E9
| 44337 ||  || — || September 14, 1998 || Socorro || LINEAR || HEN || align=right | 2.8 km || 
|-id=338 bgcolor=#E9E9E9
| 44338 ||  || — || September 14, 1998 || Socorro || LINEAR || — || align=right | 3.3 km || 
|-id=339 bgcolor=#E9E9E9
| 44339 ||  || — || September 14, 1998 || Socorro || LINEAR || HEN || align=right | 2.6 km || 
|-id=340 bgcolor=#E9E9E9
| 44340 ||  || — || September 14, 1998 || Socorro || LINEAR || — || align=right | 5.1 km || 
|-id=341 bgcolor=#E9E9E9
| 44341 ||  || — || September 14, 1998 || Socorro || LINEAR || — || align=right | 2.3 km || 
|-id=342 bgcolor=#d6d6d6
| 44342 ||  || — || September 14, 1998 || Socorro || LINEAR || — || align=right | 8.8 km || 
|-id=343 bgcolor=#E9E9E9
| 44343 ||  || — || September 14, 1998 || Socorro || LINEAR || — || align=right | 3.4 km || 
|-id=344 bgcolor=#E9E9E9
| 44344 ||  || — || September 14, 1998 || Socorro || LINEAR || — || align=right | 5.4 km || 
|-id=345 bgcolor=#E9E9E9
| 44345 ||  || — || September 14, 1998 || Socorro || LINEAR || — || align=right | 3.6 km || 
|-id=346 bgcolor=#E9E9E9
| 44346 ||  || — || September 14, 1998 || Socorro || LINEAR || — || align=right | 8.4 km || 
|-id=347 bgcolor=#E9E9E9
| 44347 ||  || — || September 14, 1998 || Socorro || LINEAR || — || align=right | 2.4 km || 
|-id=348 bgcolor=#E9E9E9
| 44348 ||  || — || September 14, 1998 || Socorro || LINEAR || — || align=right | 5.1 km || 
|-id=349 bgcolor=#d6d6d6
| 44349 ||  || — || September 14, 1998 || Socorro || LINEAR || — || align=right | 11 km || 
|-id=350 bgcolor=#d6d6d6
| 44350 ||  || — || September 14, 1998 || Socorro || LINEAR || — || align=right | 12 km || 
|-id=351 bgcolor=#E9E9E9
| 44351 ||  || — || September 14, 1998 || Socorro || LINEAR || — || align=right | 2.7 km || 
|-id=352 bgcolor=#d6d6d6
| 44352 ||  || — || September 14, 1998 || Socorro || LINEAR || EOS || align=right | 4.9 km || 
|-id=353 bgcolor=#d6d6d6
| 44353 ||  || — || September 16, 1998 || Caussols || ODAS || — || align=right | 6.3 km || 
|-id=354 bgcolor=#E9E9E9
| 44354 ||  || — || September 16, 1998 || Nachi-Katsuura || Y. Shimizu, T. Urata || EUN || align=right | 5.1 km || 
|-id=355 bgcolor=#E9E9E9
| 44355 ||  || — || September 18, 1998 || Colleverde || V. S. Casulli || — || align=right | 2.7 km || 
|-id=356 bgcolor=#E9E9E9
| 44356 ||  || — || September 20, 1998 || Kitt Peak || Spacewatch || — || align=right | 5.7 km || 
|-id=357 bgcolor=#d6d6d6
| 44357 ||  || — || September 20, 1998 || Kitt Peak || Spacewatch || — || align=right | 5.6 km || 
|-id=358 bgcolor=#E9E9E9
| 44358 ||  || — || September 20, 1998 || Kitt Peak || Spacewatch || EUN || align=right | 4.4 km || 
|-id=359 bgcolor=#E9E9E9
| 44359 ||  || — || September 17, 1998 || Xinglong || SCAP || GEF || align=right | 3.6 km || 
|-id=360 bgcolor=#d6d6d6
| 44360 ||  || — || September 18, 1998 || Caussols || ODAS || — || align=right | 6.4 km || 
|-id=361 bgcolor=#E9E9E9
| 44361 ||  || — || September 21, 1998 || Caussols || ODAS || — || align=right | 4.1 km || 
|-id=362 bgcolor=#E9E9E9
| 44362 ||  || — || September 17, 1998 || Anderson Mesa || LONEOS || — || align=right | 4.1 km || 
|-id=363 bgcolor=#E9E9E9
| 44363 ||  || — || September 20, 1998 || Kitt Peak || Spacewatch || — || align=right | 4.5 km || 
|-id=364 bgcolor=#fefefe
| 44364 ||  || — || September 23, 1998 || Višnjan Observatory || Višnjan Obs. || — || align=right | 2.1 km || 
|-id=365 bgcolor=#E9E9E9
| 44365 ||  || — || September 23, 1998 || Višnjan Observatory || Višnjan Obs. || — || align=right | 2.7 km || 
|-id=366 bgcolor=#E9E9E9
| 44366 ||  || — || September 17, 1998 || Anderson Mesa || LONEOS || WIT || align=right | 3.3 km || 
|-id=367 bgcolor=#E9E9E9
| 44367 ||  || — || September 22, 1998 || Anderson Mesa || LONEOS || EUN || align=right | 3.7 km || 
|-id=368 bgcolor=#E9E9E9
| 44368 Andreafrigo ||  ||  || September 23, 1998 || Stroncone || A. Vagnozzi || GEF || align=right | 3.6 km || 
|-id=369 bgcolor=#d6d6d6
| 44369 ||  || — || September 23, 1998 || Kitt Peak || Spacewatch || — || align=right | 5.9 km || 
|-id=370 bgcolor=#E9E9E9
| 44370 ||  || — || September 27, 1998 || Baton Rouge || W. R. Cooney Jr., K. Wefel || — || align=right | 3.2 km || 
|-id=371 bgcolor=#E9E9E9
| 44371 ||  || — || September 21, 1998 || Kitt Peak || Spacewatch || — || align=right | 7.0 km || 
|-id=372 bgcolor=#E9E9E9
| 44372 ||  || — || September 23, 1998 || Kitt Peak || Spacewatch || — || align=right | 2.0 km || 
|-id=373 bgcolor=#E9E9E9
| 44373 ||  || — || September 17, 1998 || Xinglong || SCAP || DOR || align=right | 7.0 km || 
|-id=374 bgcolor=#E9E9E9
| 44374 ||  || — || September 20, 1998 || Xinglong || SCAP || — || align=right | 3.0 km || 
|-id=375 bgcolor=#E9E9E9
| 44375 ||  || — || September 25, 1998 || Kitt Peak || Spacewatch || — || align=right | 4.5 km || 
|-id=376 bgcolor=#d6d6d6
| 44376 ||  || — || September 27, 1998 || Kitt Peak || Spacewatch || KOR || align=right | 3.3 km || 
|-id=377 bgcolor=#E9E9E9
| 44377 ||  || — || September 16, 1998 || Anderson Mesa || LONEOS || — || align=right | 4.5 km || 
|-id=378 bgcolor=#E9E9E9
| 44378 ||  || — || September 16, 1998 || Anderson Mesa || LONEOS || — || align=right | 4.1 km || 
|-id=379 bgcolor=#E9E9E9
| 44379 ||  || — || September 16, 1998 || Anderson Mesa || LONEOS || — || align=right | 3.5 km || 
|-id=380 bgcolor=#E9E9E9
| 44380 ||  || — || September 17, 1998 || Anderson Mesa || LONEOS || — || align=right | 3.1 km || 
|-id=381 bgcolor=#d6d6d6
| 44381 ||  || — || September 17, 1998 || Anderson Mesa || LONEOS || — || align=right | 4.0 km || 
|-id=382 bgcolor=#E9E9E9
| 44382 ||  || — || September 17, 1998 || Anderson Mesa || LONEOS || — || align=right | 7.2 km || 
|-id=383 bgcolor=#d6d6d6
| 44383 ||  || — || September 17, 1998 || Anderson Mesa || LONEOS || KOR || align=right | 5.6 km || 
|-id=384 bgcolor=#E9E9E9
| 44384 ||  || — || September 17, 1998 || Anderson Mesa || LONEOS || — || align=right | 5.6 km || 
|-id=385 bgcolor=#E9E9E9
| 44385 ||  || — || September 17, 1998 || Anderson Mesa || LONEOS || — || align=right | 4.7 km || 
|-id=386 bgcolor=#E9E9E9
| 44386 ||  || — || September 17, 1998 || Anderson Mesa || LONEOS || — || align=right | 6.1 km || 
|-id=387 bgcolor=#E9E9E9
| 44387 ||  || — || September 25, 1998 || Xinglong || SCAP || EUN || align=right | 2.9 km || 
|-id=388 bgcolor=#d6d6d6
| 44388 ||  || — || September 27, 1998 || Xinglong || SCAP || — || align=right | 7.2 km || 
|-id=389 bgcolor=#d6d6d6
| 44389 ||  || — || September 29, 1998 || Xinglong || SCAP || EOS || align=right | 6.1 km || 
|-id=390 bgcolor=#E9E9E9
| 44390 ||  || — || September 29, 1998 || Višnjan Observatory || Višnjan Obs. || — || align=right | 3.8 km || 
|-id=391 bgcolor=#E9E9E9
| 44391 ||  || — || September 20, 1998 || La Silla || E. W. Elst || — || align=right | 3.8 km || 
|-id=392 bgcolor=#E9E9E9
| 44392 ||  || — || September 20, 1998 || La Silla || E. W. Elst || — || align=right | 4.2 km || 
|-id=393 bgcolor=#d6d6d6
| 44393 ||  || — || September 20, 1998 || La Silla || E. W. Elst || — || align=right | 8.2 km || 
|-id=394 bgcolor=#E9E9E9
| 44394 ||  || — || September 20, 1998 || La Silla || E. W. Elst || DOR || align=right | 6.1 km || 
|-id=395 bgcolor=#E9E9E9
| 44395 ||  || — || September 19, 1998 || Socorro || LINEAR || — || align=right | 4.6 km || 
|-id=396 bgcolor=#E9E9E9
| 44396 ||  || — || September 19, 1998 || Socorro || LINEAR || MAR || align=right | 2.9 km || 
|-id=397 bgcolor=#E9E9E9
| 44397 ||  || — || September 21, 1998 || La Silla || E. W. Elst || — || align=right | 5.6 km || 
|-id=398 bgcolor=#E9E9E9
| 44398 ||  || — || September 21, 1998 || La Silla || E. W. Elst || GEF || align=right | 3.0 km || 
|-id=399 bgcolor=#E9E9E9
| 44399 ||  || — || September 26, 1998 || Socorro || LINEAR || HEN || align=right | 2.9 km || 
|-id=400 bgcolor=#E9E9E9
| 44400 ||  || — || September 26, 1998 || Socorro || LINEAR || NEM || align=right | 5.0 km || 
|}

44401–44500 

|-bgcolor=#E9E9E9
| 44401 ||  || — || September 26, 1998 || Socorro || LINEAR || — || align=right | 4.8 km || 
|-id=402 bgcolor=#E9E9E9
| 44402 ||  || — || September 26, 1998 || Socorro || LINEAR || WIT || align=right | 3.5 km || 
|-id=403 bgcolor=#E9E9E9
| 44403 ||  || — || September 26, 1998 || Socorro || LINEAR || EUN || align=right | 2.8 km || 
|-id=404 bgcolor=#E9E9E9
| 44404 ||  || — || September 26, 1998 || Socorro || LINEAR || — || align=right | 3.6 km || 
|-id=405 bgcolor=#d6d6d6
| 44405 ||  || — || September 26, 1998 || Socorro || LINEAR || — || align=right | 5.8 km || 
|-id=406 bgcolor=#d6d6d6
| 44406 ||  || — || September 26, 1998 || Socorro || LINEAR || — || align=right | 3.7 km || 
|-id=407 bgcolor=#E9E9E9
| 44407 ||  || — || September 26, 1998 || Socorro || LINEAR || — || align=right | 5.5 km || 
|-id=408 bgcolor=#E9E9E9
| 44408 ||  || — || September 26, 1998 || Socorro || LINEAR || — || align=right | 4.2 km || 
|-id=409 bgcolor=#E9E9E9
| 44409 ||  || — || September 26, 1998 || Socorro || LINEAR || — || align=right | 6.0 km || 
|-id=410 bgcolor=#E9E9E9
| 44410 ||  || — || September 26, 1998 || Socorro || LINEAR || HOF || align=right | 9.5 km || 
|-id=411 bgcolor=#E9E9E9
| 44411 ||  || — || September 26, 1998 || Socorro || LINEAR || — || align=right | 7.1 km || 
|-id=412 bgcolor=#E9E9E9
| 44412 ||  || — || September 26, 1998 || Socorro || LINEAR || — || align=right | 3.2 km || 
|-id=413 bgcolor=#E9E9E9
| 44413 ||  || — || September 26, 1998 || Socorro || LINEAR || — || align=right | 9.9 km || 
|-id=414 bgcolor=#E9E9E9
| 44414 ||  || — || September 26, 1998 || Socorro || LINEAR || ADE || align=right | 7.3 km || 
|-id=415 bgcolor=#E9E9E9
| 44415 ||  || — || September 26, 1998 || Socorro || LINEAR || — || align=right | 5.2 km || 
|-id=416 bgcolor=#E9E9E9
| 44416 ||  || — || September 18, 1998 || La Silla || E. W. Elst || — || align=right | 5.4 km || 
|-id=417 bgcolor=#d6d6d6
| 44417 ||  || — || September 20, 1998 || La Silla || E. W. Elst || EOS || align=right | 7.5 km || 
|-id=418 bgcolor=#E9E9E9
| 44418 ||  || — || September 20, 1998 || La Silla || E. W. Elst || — || align=right | 5.3 km || 
|-id=419 bgcolor=#E9E9E9
| 44419 ||  || — || September 26, 1998 || Socorro || LINEAR || PAD || align=right | 5.2 km || 
|-id=420 bgcolor=#E9E9E9
| 44420 ||  || — || September 26, 1998 || Socorro || LINEAR || AGN || align=right | 3.1 km || 
|-id=421 bgcolor=#E9E9E9
| 44421 ||  || — || September 26, 1998 || Socorro || LINEAR || DOR || align=right | 6.4 km || 
|-id=422 bgcolor=#E9E9E9
| 44422 ||  || — || September 26, 1998 || Socorro || LINEAR || — || align=right | 4.8 km || 
|-id=423 bgcolor=#E9E9E9
| 44423 ||  || — || September 26, 1998 || Socorro || LINEAR || — || align=right | 5.2 km || 
|-id=424 bgcolor=#E9E9E9
| 44424 ||  || — || October 12, 1998 || Kitt Peak || Spacewatch || — || align=right | 2.9 km || 
|-id=425 bgcolor=#E9E9E9
| 44425 ||  || — || October 13, 1998 || Reedy Creek || J. Broughton || WIT || align=right | 3.2 km || 
|-id=426 bgcolor=#d6d6d6
| 44426 ||  || — || October 12, 1998 || Kitt Peak || Spacewatch || — || align=right | 8.6 km || 
|-id=427 bgcolor=#d6d6d6
| 44427 ||  || — || October 13, 1998 || Višnjan Observatory || K. Korlević || — || align=right | 9.4 km || 
|-id=428 bgcolor=#fefefe
| 44428 ||  || — || October 13, 1998 || Višnjan Observatory || K. Korlević || — || align=right | 2.1 km || 
|-id=429 bgcolor=#fefefe
| 44429 ||  || — || October 13, 1998 || Višnjan Observatory || K. Korlević || FLO || align=right | 3.0 km || 
|-id=430 bgcolor=#E9E9E9
| 44430 ||  || — || October 15, 1998 || Reedy Creek || J. Broughton || EUN || align=right | 3.4 km || 
|-id=431 bgcolor=#E9E9E9
| 44431 ||  || — || October 14, 1998 || Xinglong || SCAP || — || align=right | 2.4 km || 
|-id=432 bgcolor=#d6d6d6
| 44432 ||  || — || October 15, 1998 || Xinglong || SCAP || URS || align=right | 9.9 km || 
|-id=433 bgcolor=#E9E9E9
| 44433 ||  || — || October 10, 1998 || Anderson Mesa || LONEOS || XIZ || align=right | 3.4 km || 
|-id=434 bgcolor=#fefefe
| 44434 ||  || — || October 20, 1998 || Višnjan Observatory || K. Korlević || — || align=right | 3.0 km || 
|-id=435 bgcolor=#fefefe
| 44435 ||  || — || October 22, 1998 || Višnjan Observatory || K. Korlević || — || align=right | 3.5 km || 
|-id=436 bgcolor=#E9E9E9
| 44436 ||  || — || October 22, 1998 || Višnjan Observatory || K. Korlević || — || align=right | 3.6 km || 
|-id=437 bgcolor=#fefefe
| 44437 ||  || — || October 22, 1998 || Višnjan Observatory || K. Korlević || FLO || align=right | 1.6 km || 
|-id=438 bgcolor=#d6d6d6
| 44438 ||  || — || October 23, 1998 || Višnjan Observatory || K. Korlević || ALA || align=right | 14 km || 
|-id=439 bgcolor=#E9E9E9
| 44439 ||  || — || October 17, 1998 || Xinglong || SCAP || — || align=right | 3.5 km || 
|-id=440 bgcolor=#fefefe
| 44440 ||  || — || October 23, 1998 || Višnjan Observatory || K. Korlević || — || align=right | 2.0 km || 
|-id=441 bgcolor=#E9E9E9
| 44441 ||  || — || October 24, 1998 || Višnjan Observatory || K. Korlević || — || align=right | 5.8 km || 
|-id=442 bgcolor=#E9E9E9
| 44442 ||  || — || October 17, 1998 || Xinglong || SCAP || PAD || align=right | 6.1 km || 
|-id=443 bgcolor=#d6d6d6
| 44443 ||  || — || October 26, 1998 || Višnjan Observatory || K. Korlević || TIR || align=right | 9.1 km || 
|-id=444 bgcolor=#E9E9E9
| 44444 ||  || — || October 26, 1998 || Višnjan Observatory || K. Korlević || — || align=right | 5.7 km || 
|-id=445 bgcolor=#E9E9E9
| 44445 ||  || — || October 29, 1998 || Višnjan Observatory || K. Korlević || EUN || align=right | 3.5 km || 
|-id=446 bgcolor=#E9E9E9
| 44446 ||  || — || October 28, 1998 || Socorro || LINEAR || — || align=right | 3.9 km || 
|-id=447 bgcolor=#E9E9E9
| 44447 ||  || — || October 28, 1998 || Socorro || LINEAR || — || align=right | 3.7 km || 
|-id=448 bgcolor=#d6d6d6
| 44448 ||  || — || October 31, 1998 || Gekko || T. Kagawa || EOS || align=right | 6.5 km || 
|-id=449 bgcolor=#E9E9E9
| 44449 ||  || — || October 18, 1998 || Anderson Mesa || LONEOS || — || align=right | 4.5 km || 
|-id=450 bgcolor=#E9E9E9
| 44450 ||  || — || October 18, 1998 || La Silla || E. W. Elst || — || align=right | 5.4 km || 
|-id=451 bgcolor=#d6d6d6
| 44451 ||  || — || October 18, 1998 || La Silla || E. W. Elst || — || align=right | 6.1 km || 
|-id=452 bgcolor=#d6d6d6
| 44452 ||  || — || October 30, 1998 || Xinglong || SCAP || — || align=right | 5.6 km || 
|-id=453 bgcolor=#E9E9E9
| 44453 ||  || — || October 28, 1998 || Socorro || LINEAR || — || align=right | 3.6 km || 
|-id=454 bgcolor=#E9E9E9
| 44454 ||  || — || October 28, 1998 || Socorro || LINEAR || — || align=right | 3.8 km || 
|-id=455 bgcolor=#E9E9E9
| 44455 Artdula || 1998 VK ||  || November 7, 1998 || Goodricke-Pigott || R. A. Tucker || EUN || align=right | 2.7 km || 
|-id=456 bgcolor=#d6d6d6
| 44456 ||  || — || November 11, 1998 || Caussols || ODAS || — || align=right | 5.6 km || 
|-id=457 bgcolor=#E9E9E9
| 44457 ||  || — || November 10, 1998 || Socorro || LINEAR || — || align=right | 2.7 km || 
|-id=458 bgcolor=#E9E9E9
| 44458 ||  || — || November 10, 1998 || Socorro || LINEAR || — || align=right | 5.5 km || 
|-id=459 bgcolor=#E9E9E9
| 44459 ||  || — || November 10, 1998 || Socorro || LINEAR || — || align=right | 5.0 km || 
|-id=460 bgcolor=#E9E9E9
| 44460 ||  || — || November 10, 1998 || Socorro || LINEAR || — || align=right | 4.7 km || 
|-id=461 bgcolor=#E9E9E9
| 44461 ||  || — || November 10, 1998 || Socorro || LINEAR || GEF || align=right | 4.2 km || 
|-id=462 bgcolor=#E9E9E9
| 44462 ||  || — || November 10, 1998 || Socorro || LINEAR || — || align=right | 5.5 km || 
|-id=463 bgcolor=#d6d6d6
| 44463 ||  || — || November 10, 1998 || Socorro || LINEAR || LIX || align=right | 13 km || 
|-id=464 bgcolor=#E9E9E9
| 44464 ||  || — || November 10, 1998 || Socorro || LINEAR || — || align=right | 2.1 km || 
|-id=465 bgcolor=#E9E9E9
| 44465 ||  || — || November 10, 1998 || Socorro || LINEAR || — || align=right | 5.9 km || 
|-id=466 bgcolor=#d6d6d6
| 44466 ||  || — || November 10, 1998 || Socorro || LINEAR || — || align=right | 7.1 km || 
|-id=467 bgcolor=#E9E9E9
| 44467 ||  || — || November 10, 1998 || Socorro || LINEAR || GEF || align=right | 3.6 km || 
|-id=468 bgcolor=#d6d6d6
| 44468 ||  || — || November 11, 1998 || Fair Oaks Ranch || J. V. McClusky || — || align=right | 8.9 km || 
|-id=469 bgcolor=#d6d6d6
| 44469 ||  || — || November 10, 1998 || Caussols || ODAS || KOR || align=right | 3.1 km || 
|-id=470 bgcolor=#E9E9E9
| 44470 ||  || — || November 12, 1998 || Xinglong || SCAP || MIT || align=right | 6.0 km || 
|-id=471 bgcolor=#E9E9E9
| 44471 ||  || — || November 10, 1998 || Socorro || LINEAR || — || align=right | 2.9 km || 
|-id=472 bgcolor=#E9E9E9
| 44472 ||  || — || November 14, 1998 || Socorro || LINEAR || — || align=right | 3.5 km || 
|-id=473 bgcolor=#d6d6d6
| 44473 Randytatum || 1998 WB ||  || November 16, 1998 || Catalina || CSS || ALA || align=right | 12 km || 
|-id=474 bgcolor=#d6d6d6
| 44474 || 1998 WE || — || November 16, 1998 || Zeno || T. Stafford || THM || align=right | 8.7 km || 
|-id=475 bgcolor=#E9E9E9
| 44475 Hikarumasai || 1998 WF ||  || November 16, 1998 || Goodricke-Pigott || R. A. Tucker || — || align=right | 4.6 km || 
|-id=476 bgcolor=#d6d6d6
| 44476 ||  || — || November 19, 1998 || Oizumi || T. Kobayashi || — || align=right | 7.2 km || 
|-id=477 bgcolor=#d6d6d6
| 44477 ||  || — || November 20, 1998 || Gekko || T. Kagawa || KOR || align=right | 3.5 km || 
|-id=478 bgcolor=#E9E9E9
| 44478 ||  || — || November 23, 1998 || Zeno || T. Stafford || MIS || align=right | 6.0 km || 
|-id=479 bgcolor=#d6d6d6
| 44479 Oláheszter ||  ||  || November 24, 1998 || Piszkéstető || L. Kiss, K. Sárneczky || — || align=right | 5.9 km || 
|-id=480 bgcolor=#E9E9E9
| 44480 ||  || — || November 16, 1998 || Socorro || LINEAR || — || align=right | 3.4 km || 
|-id=481 bgcolor=#E9E9E9
| 44481 ||  || — || November 21, 1998 || Socorro || LINEAR || — || align=right | 5.4 km || 
|-id=482 bgcolor=#d6d6d6
| 44482 ||  || — || November 21, 1998 || Socorro || LINEAR || — || align=right | 7.0 km || 
|-id=483 bgcolor=#d6d6d6
| 44483 ||  || — || November 21, 1998 || Socorro || LINEAR || — || align=right | 4.2 km || 
|-id=484 bgcolor=#E9E9E9
| 44484 ||  || — || November 21, 1998 || Socorro || LINEAR || XIZ || align=right | 5.4 km || 
|-id=485 bgcolor=#d6d6d6
| 44485 ||  || — || November 21, 1998 || Socorro || LINEAR || — || align=right | 9.7 km || 
|-id=486 bgcolor=#E9E9E9
| 44486 ||  || — || November 29, 1998 || Woomera || F. B. Zoltowski || — || align=right | 3.6 km || 
|-id=487 bgcolor=#E9E9E9
| 44487 ||  || — || November 26, 1998 || Uto || F. Uto || — || align=right | 8.2 km || 
|-id=488 bgcolor=#E9E9E9
| 44488 ||  || — || November 18, 1998 || Socorro || LINEAR || MAR || align=right | 2.4 km || 
|-id=489 bgcolor=#d6d6d6
| 44489 ||  || — || November 18, 1998 || Socorro || LINEAR || EOS || align=right | 5.1 km || 
|-id=490 bgcolor=#d6d6d6
| 44490 ||  || — || November 18, 1998 || Socorro || LINEAR || KOR || align=right | 5.1 km || 
|-id=491 bgcolor=#d6d6d6
| 44491 ||  || — || November 28, 1998 || Višnjan Observatory || K. Korlević || — || align=right | 12 km || 
|-id=492 bgcolor=#d6d6d6
| 44492 ||  || — || November 19, 1998 || Catalina || CSS || LUT || align=right | 12 km || 
|-id=493 bgcolor=#E9E9E9
| 44493 ||  || — || November 16, 1998 || Socorro || LINEAR || — || align=right | 6.6 km || 
|-id=494 bgcolor=#E9E9E9
| 44494 ||  || — || November 18, 1998 || Socorro || LINEAR || — || align=right | 3.7 km || 
|-id=495 bgcolor=#E9E9E9
| 44495 ||  || — || December 12, 1998 || Socorro || LINEAR || — || align=right | 6.8 km || 
|-id=496 bgcolor=#d6d6d6
| 44496 ||  || — || December 8, 1998 || Višnjan Observatory || K. Korlević || — || align=right | 10 km || 
|-id=497 bgcolor=#d6d6d6
| 44497 ||  || — || December 13, 1998 || Oizumi || T. Kobayashi || — || align=right | 7.5 km || 
|-id=498 bgcolor=#d6d6d6
| 44498 ||  || — || December 13, 1998 || Oizumi || T. Kobayashi || THM || align=right | 7.5 km || 
|-id=499 bgcolor=#fefefe
| 44499 ||  || — || December 15, 1998 || Višnjan Observatory || K. Korlević || — || align=right | 3.0 km || 
|-id=500 bgcolor=#d6d6d6
| 44500 ||  || — || December 12, 1998 || Dynic || Y. Ikari || HYG || align=right | 8.6 km || 
|}

44501–44600 

|-bgcolor=#d6d6d6
| 44501 ||  || — || December 10, 1998 || Kitt Peak || Spacewatch || — || align=right | 10 km || 
|-id=502 bgcolor=#E9E9E9
| 44502 ||  || — || December 14, 1998 || Socorro || LINEAR || CLO || align=right | 3.9 km || 
|-id=503 bgcolor=#E9E9E9
| 44503 ||  || — || December 14, 1998 || Socorro || LINEAR || — || align=right | 4.6 km || 
|-id=504 bgcolor=#E9E9E9
| 44504 ||  || — || December 14, 1998 || Socorro || LINEAR || ADE || align=right | 9.9 km || 
|-id=505 bgcolor=#E9E9E9
| 44505 ||  || — || December 14, 1998 || Socorro || LINEAR || — || align=right | 7.7 km || 
|-id=506 bgcolor=#E9E9E9
| 44506 ||  || — || December 14, 1998 || Socorro || LINEAR || — || align=right | 6.9 km || 
|-id=507 bgcolor=#d6d6d6
| 44507 ||  || — || December 14, 1998 || Socorro || LINEAR || — || align=right | 4.8 km || 
|-id=508 bgcolor=#d6d6d6
| 44508 ||  || — || December 14, 1998 || Socorro || LINEAR || HYG || align=right | 8.6 km || 
|-id=509 bgcolor=#d6d6d6
| 44509 ||  || — || December 14, 1998 || Socorro || LINEAR || MEL || align=right | 12 km || 
|-id=510 bgcolor=#d6d6d6
| 44510 ||  || — || December 14, 1998 || Socorro || LINEAR || EOS || align=right | 7.4 km || 
|-id=511 bgcolor=#d6d6d6
| 44511 ||  || — || December 14, 1998 || Socorro || LINEAR || — || align=right | 15 km || 
|-id=512 bgcolor=#E9E9E9
| 44512 ||  || — || December 15, 1998 || Socorro || LINEAR || CLO || align=right | 6.8 km || 
|-id=513 bgcolor=#d6d6d6
| 44513 ||  || — || December 12, 1998 || Socorro || LINEAR || — || align=right | 15 km || 
|-id=514 bgcolor=#E9E9E9
| 44514 ||  || — || December 14, 1998 || Socorro || LINEAR || — || align=right | 3.7 km || 
|-id=515 bgcolor=#d6d6d6
| 44515 ||  || — || December 14, 1998 || Socorro || LINEAR || — || align=right | 12 km || 
|-id=516 bgcolor=#d6d6d6
| 44516 ||  || — || December 15, 1998 || Socorro || LINEAR || — || align=right | 5.2 km || 
|-id=517 bgcolor=#d6d6d6
| 44517 ||  || — || December 15, 1998 || Socorro || LINEAR || — || align=right | 4.6 km || 
|-id=518 bgcolor=#d6d6d6
| 44518 ||  || — || December 15, 1998 || Socorro || LINEAR || EOS || align=right | 6.0 km || 
|-id=519 bgcolor=#d6d6d6
| 44519 ||  || — || December 15, 1998 || Socorro || LINEAR || TIR || align=right | 12 km || 
|-id=520 bgcolor=#d6d6d6
| 44520 ||  || — || December 15, 1998 || Socorro || LINEAR || — || align=right | 8.1 km || 
|-id=521 bgcolor=#E9E9E9
| 44521 ||  || — || December 15, 1998 || Socorro || LINEAR || — || align=right | 7.5 km || 
|-id=522 bgcolor=#fefefe
| 44522 ||  || — || December 16, 1998 || Višnjan Observatory || K. Korlević || — || align=right | 2.5 km || 
|-id=523 bgcolor=#E9E9E9
| 44523 ||  || — || December 16, 1998 || Višnjan Observatory || K. Korlević || GEF || align=right | 3.2 km || 
|-id=524 bgcolor=#d6d6d6
| 44524 ||  || — || December 19, 1998 || Oizumi || T. Kobayashi || — || align=right | 12 km || 
|-id=525 bgcolor=#d6d6d6
| 44525 ||  || — || December 19, 1998 || Oizumi || T. Kobayashi || — || align=right | 14 km || 
|-id=526 bgcolor=#E9E9E9
| 44526 ||  || — || December 16, 1998 || Socorro || LINEAR || MAR || align=right | 3.4 km || 
|-id=527 bgcolor=#E9E9E9
| 44527 Tonnon ||  ||  || December 22, 1998 || Cocoa || I. P. Griffin || — || align=right | 7.0 km || 
|-id=528 bgcolor=#E9E9E9
| 44528 ||  || — || December 22, 1998 || Višnjan Observatory || K. Korlević || GEF || align=right | 4.7 km || 
|-id=529 bgcolor=#d6d6d6
| 44529 ||  || — || December 22, 1998 || Reedy Creek || J. Broughton || EOS || align=right | 4.3 km || 
|-id=530 bgcolor=#E9E9E9
| 44530 Horáková ||  ||  || December 25, 1998 || Kleť || J. Tichá, M. Tichý || slow? || align=right | 7.1 km || 
|-id=531 bgcolor=#d6d6d6
| 44531 ||  || — || December 17, 1998 || Xinglong || SCAP || — || align=right | 13 km || 
|-id=532 bgcolor=#d6d6d6
| 44532 ||  || — || December 23, 1998 || Xinglong || SCAP || EOS || align=right | 6.4 km || 
|-id=533 bgcolor=#E9E9E9
| 44533 ||  || — || December 24, 1998 || Višnjan Observatory || K. Korlević, M. Jurić || — || align=right | 4.6 km || 
|-id=534 bgcolor=#fefefe
| 44534 ||  || — || December 25, 1998 || Višnjan Observatory || K. Korlević, M. Jurić || FLO || align=right | 1.9 km || 
|-id=535 bgcolor=#d6d6d6
| 44535 ||  || — || December 22, 1998 || Kitt Peak || Spacewatch || — || align=right | 6.3 km || 
|-id=536 bgcolor=#E9E9E9
| 44536 ||  || — || December 19, 1998 || Socorro || LINEAR || INO || align=right | 2.7 km || 
|-id=537 bgcolor=#fefefe
| 44537 || 1999 AG || — || January 5, 1999 || Višnjan Observatory || K. Korlević || FLO || align=right | 1.8 km || 
|-id=538 bgcolor=#d6d6d6
| 44538 ||  || — || January 9, 1999 || Oizumi || T. Kobayashi || — || align=right | 8.4 km || 
|-id=539 bgcolor=#fefefe
| 44539 ||  || — || January 9, 1999 || Višnjan Observatory || K. Korlević || FLO || align=right | 1.8 km || 
|-id=540 bgcolor=#E9E9E9
| 44540 ||  || — || January 8, 1999 || Socorro || LINEAR || EUN || align=right | 4.9 km || 
|-id=541 bgcolor=#fefefe
| 44541 ||  || — || January 9, 1999 || Višnjan Observatory || K. Korlević || — || align=right | 2.6 km || 
|-id=542 bgcolor=#d6d6d6
| 44542 ||  || — || January 9, 1999 || Višnjan Observatory || K. Korlević || — || align=right | 7.5 km || 
|-id=543 bgcolor=#d6d6d6
| 44543 ||  || — || January 9, 1999 || Anderson Mesa || LONEOS || — || align=right | 6.3 km || 
|-id=544 bgcolor=#E9E9E9
| 44544 ||  || — || January 14, 1999 || Anderson Mesa || LONEOS || MAR || align=right | 6.5 km || 
|-id=545 bgcolor=#d6d6d6
| 44545 ||  || — || January 13, 1999 || Fair Oaks Ranch || J. V. McClusky || — || align=right | 8.0 km || 
|-id=546 bgcolor=#d6d6d6
| 44546 || 1999 BR || — || January 16, 1999 || Višnjan Observatory || K. Korlević || — || align=right | 6.8 km || 
|-id=547 bgcolor=#d6d6d6
| 44547 ||  || — || January 19, 1999 || Needville || Needville Obs. || 7:4 || align=right | 11 km || 
|-id=548 bgcolor=#d6d6d6
| 44548 ||  || — || January 20, 1999 || Višnjan Observatory || K. Korlević || — || align=right | 6.1 km || 
|-id=549 bgcolor=#d6d6d6
| 44549 ||  || — || January 24, 1999 || Višnjan Observatory || K. Korlević || 3:2 || align=right | 13 km || 
|-id=550 bgcolor=#d6d6d6
| 44550 ||  || — || January 18, 1999 || Socorro || LINEAR || — || align=right | 14 km || 
|-id=551 bgcolor=#d6d6d6
| 44551 ||  || — || January 17, 1999 || Kitt Peak || Spacewatch || LIX || align=right | 13 km || 
|-id=552 bgcolor=#d6d6d6
| 44552 ||  || — || January 17, 1999 || Kitt Peak || Spacewatch || — || align=right | 12 km || 
|-id=553 bgcolor=#E9E9E9
| 44553 ||  || — || February 12, 1999 || Gekko || T. Kagawa || — || align=right | 12 km || 
|-id=554 bgcolor=#E9E9E9
| 44554 ||  || — || February 14, 1999 || Oizumi || T. Kobayashi || — || align=right | 3.7 km || 
|-id=555 bgcolor=#fefefe
| 44555 ||  || — || February 12, 1999 || Socorro || LINEAR || H || align=right | 2.1 km || 
|-id=556 bgcolor=#E9E9E9
| 44556 ||  || — || February 10, 1999 || Socorro || LINEAR || EUN || align=right | 5.4 km || 
|-id=557 bgcolor=#d6d6d6
| 44557 ||  || — || February 10, 1999 || Socorro || LINEAR || — || align=right | 8.5 km || 
|-id=558 bgcolor=#d6d6d6
| 44558 ||  || — || February 10, 1999 || Socorro || LINEAR || — || align=right | 11 km || 
|-id=559 bgcolor=#E9E9E9
| 44559 ||  || — || February 10, 1999 || Socorro || LINEAR || — || align=right | 7.8 km || 
|-id=560 bgcolor=#E9E9E9
| 44560 ||  || — || February 10, 1999 || Socorro || LINEAR || — || align=right | 3.8 km || 
|-id=561 bgcolor=#d6d6d6
| 44561 ||  || — || February 10, 1999 || Socorro || LINEAR || — || align=right | 7.1 km || 
|-id=562 bgcolor=#d6d6d6
| 44562 ||  || — || February 10, 1999 || Socorro || LINEAR || THM || align=right | 6.8 km || 
|-id=563 bgcolor=#d6d6d6
| 44563 ||  || — || February 12, 1999 || Socorro || LINEAR || — || align=right | 6.7 km || 
|-id=564 bgcolor=#E9E9E9
| 44564 ||  || — || February 12, 1999 || Socorro || LINEAR || — || align=right | 3.2 km || 
|-id=565 bgcolor=#fefefe
| 44565 ||  || — || February 10, 1999 || Socorro || LINEAR || — || align=right | 4.9 km || 
|-id=566 bgcolor=#d6d6d6
| 44566 ||  || — || February 12, 1999 || Socorro || LINEAR || 7:4 || align=right | 28 km || 
|-id=567 bgcolor=#fefefe
| 44567 ||  || — || February 12, 1999 || Socorro || LINEAR || NYS || align=right | 1.5 km || 
|-id=568 bgcolor=#d6d6d6
| 44568 ||  || — || February 12, 1999 || Socorro || LINEAR || HYG || align=right | 7.4 km || 
|-id=569 bgcolor=#fefefe
| 44569 ||  || — || February 7, 1999 || Kitt Peak || Spacewatch || V || align=right | 2.0 km || 
|-id=570 bgcolor=#E9E9E9
| 44570 ||  || — || March 16, 1999 || Caussols || ODAS || EUN || align=right | 4.9 km || 
|-id=571 bgcolor=#d6d6d6
| 44571 ||  || — || March 20, 1999 || Kitt Peak || Spacewatch || — || align=right | 3.3 km || 
|-id=572 bgcolor=#fefefe
| 44572 ||  || — || March 20, 1999 || Socorro || LINEAR || — || align=right | 3.4 km || 
|-id=573 bgcolor=#d6d6d6
| 44573 ||  || — || March 20, 1999 || Socorro || LINEAR || — || align=right | 8.0 km || 
|-id=574 bgcolor=#fefefe
| 44574 Lavoratti ||  ||  || April 4, 1999 || San Marcello || L. Tesi, M. Tombelli || NYS || align=right | 3.8 km || 
|-id=575 bgcolor=#fefefe
| 44575 ||  || — || April 7, 1999 || Kitt Peak || Spacewatch || — || align=right | 3.2 km || 
|-id=576 bgcolor=#d6d6d6
| 44576 ||  || — || April 11, 1999 || Kitt Peak || Spacewatch || fast? || align=right | 5.5 km || 
|-id=577 bgcolor=#E9E9E9
| 44577 ||  || — || April 15, 1999 || Socorro || LINEAR || — || align=right | 5.0 km || 
|-id=578 bgcolor=#fefefe
| 44578 ||  || — || April 6, 1999 || Socorro || LINEAR || SUL || align=right | 5.6 km || 
|-id=579 bgcolor=#d6d6d6
| 44579 ||  || — || April 6, 1999 || Socorro || LINEAR || KOR || align=right | 4.9 km || 
|-id=580 bgcolor=#E9E9E9
| 44580 ||  || — || April 7, 1999 || Socorro || LINEAR || — || align=right | 2.4 km || 
|-id=581 bgcolor=#fefefe
| 44581 ||  || — || April 12, 1999 || Socorro || LINEAR || — || align=right | 1.6 km || 
|-id=582 bgcolor=#d6d6d6
| 44582 ||  || — || May 8, 1999 || Catalina || CSS || — || align=right | 4.5 km || 
|-id=583 bgcolor=#fefefe
| 44583 ||  || — || May 12, 1999 || Socorro || LINEAR || H || align=right | 1.7 km || 
|-id=584 bgcolor=#fefefe
| 44584 ||  || — || May 10, 1999 || Socorro || LINEAR || NYS || align=right | 1.8 km || 
|-id=585 bgcolor=#fefefe
| 44585 ||  || — || May 10, 1999 || Socorro || LINEAR || NYS || align=right | 1.9 km || 
|-id=586 bgcolor=#E9E9E9
| 44586 ||  || — || May 12, 1999 || Socorro || LINEAR || WIT || align=right | 2.8 km || 
|-id=587 bgcolor=#fefefe
| 44587 ||  || — || May 12, 1999 || Socorro || LINEAR || FLO || align=right | 1.4 km || 
|-id=588 bgcolor=#fefefe
| 44588 ||  || — || May 14, 1999 || Socorro || LINEAR || H || align=right | 1.4 km || 
|-id=589 bgcolor=#fefefe
| 44589 ||  || — || June 11, 1999 || Socorro || LINEAR || H || align=right | 2.0 km || 
|-id=590 bgcolor=#fefefe
| 44590 ||  || — || June 12, 1999 || Socorro || LINEAR || H || align=right | 1.3 km || 
|-id=591 bgcolor=#fefefe
| 44591 ||  || — || July 14, 1999 || Socorro || LINEAR || — || align=right | 2.9 km || 
|-id=592 bgcolor=#fefefe
| 44592 || 1999 OM || — || July 17, 1999 || Reedy Creek || J. Broughton || — || align=right | 4.0 km || 
|-id=593 bgcolor=#fefefe
| 44593 ||  || — || July 22, 1999 || Socorro || LINEAR || — || align=right | 2.8 km || 
|-id=594 bgcolor=#C2E0FF
| 44594 ||  || — || July 21, 1999 || Mauna Kea || J. J. Kavelaars, B. Gladman, M. J. Holman, J.-M. Petit || centaur || align=right | 166 km || 
|-id=595 bgcolor=#fefefe
| 44595 || 1999 PE || — || August 4, 1999 || Reedy Creek || J. Broughton || V || align=right | 1.7 km || 
|-id=596 bgcolor=#fefefe
| 44596 || 1999 PF || — || August 4, 1999 || Reedy Creek || J. Broughton || FLO || align=right | 1.6 km || 
|-id=597 bgcolor=#fefefe
| 44597 Thoreau || 1999 PW ||  || August 6, 1999 || Kleť || J. Tichá, M. Tichý || FLO || align=right | 1.9 km || 
|-id=598 bgcolor=#fefefe
| 44598 ||  || — || August 7, 1999 || Anderson Mesa || LONEOS || — || align=right | 2.7 km || 
|-id=599 bgcolor=#fefefe
| 44599 ||  || — || September 6, 1999 || Višnjan Observatory || K. Korlević || — || align=right | 2.1 km || 
|-id=600 bgcolor=#fefefe
| 44600 ||  || — || September 7, 1999 || Socorro || LINEAR || H || align=right | 1.9 km || 
|}

44601–44700 

|-bgcolor=#fefefe
| 44601 ||  || — || September 7, 1999 || Socorro || LINEAR || — || align=right | 2.7 km || 
|-id=602 bgcolor=#fefefe
| 44602 ||  || — || September 7, 1999 || Socorro || LINEAR || V || align=right | 1.9 km || 
|-id=603 bgcolor=#fefefe
| 44603 ||  || — || September 7, 1999 || Socorro || LINEAR || FLO || align=right | 2.6 km || 
|-id=604 bgcolor=#fefefe
| 44604 ||  || — || September 7, 1999 || Socorro || LINEAR || — || align=right | 1.6 km || 
|-id=605 bgcolor=#fefefe
| 44605 ||  || — || September 7, 1999 || Socorro || LINEAR || — || align=right | 2.2 km || 
|-id=606 bgcolor=#fefefe
| 44606 ||  || — || September 7, 1999 || Socorro || LINEAR || — || align=right | 1.8 km || 
|-id=607 bgcolor=#fefefe
| 44607 ||  || — || September 7, 1999 || Socorro || LINEAR || FLO || align=right | 2.7 km || 
|-id=608 bgcolor=#fefefe
| 44608 ||  || — || September 7, 1999 || Socorro || LINEAR || FLO || align=right | 2.5 km || 
|-id=609 bgcolor=#fefefe
| 44609 ||  || — || September 7, 1999 || Socorro || LINEAR || FLO || align=right | 2.7 km || 
|-id=610 bgcolor=#fefefe
| 44610 ||  || — || September 7, 1999 || Socorro || LINEAR || — || align=right | 2.2 km || 
|-id=611 bgcolor=#fefefe
| 44611 ||  || — || September 7, 1999 || Socorro || LINEAR || — || align=right | 2.1 km || 
|-id=612 bgcolor=#fefefe
| 44612 ||  || — || September 7, 1999 || Višnjan Observatory || K. Korlević || — || align=right | 2.0 km || 
|-id=613 bgcolor=#fefefe
| 44613 Rudolf ||  ||  || September 8, 1999 || Ondřejov || P. Pravec, P. Kušnirák || — || align=right | 3.8 km || 
|-id=614 bgcolor=#fefefe
| 44614 ||  || — || September 10, 1999 || Višnjan Observatory || K. Korlević || — || align=right | 2.3 km || 
|-id=615 bgcolor=#fefefe
| 44615 ||  || — || September 11, 1999 || Višnjan Observatory || K. Korlević || FLO || align=right | 1.8 km || 
|-id=616 bgcolor=#fefefe
| 44616 ||  || — || September 10, 1999 || Ondřejov || P. Kušnirák, P. Pravec || NYS || align=right | 1.4 km || 
|-id=617 bgcolor=#fefefe
| 44617 ||  || — || September 12, 1999 || Višnjan Observatory || K. Korlević || FLO || align=right | 1.9 km || 
|-id=618 bgcolor=#fefefe
| 44618 ||  || — || September 13, 1999 || Višnjan Observatory || K. Korlević || — || align=right | 2.5 km || 
|-id=619 bgcolor=#FA8072
| 44619 ||  || — || September 14, 1999 || Višnjan Observatory || K. Korlević || fast? || align=right | 1.9 km || 
|-id=620 bgcolor=#fefefe
| 44620 ||  || — || September 12, 1999 || Višnjan Observatory || K. Korlević || moon || align=right | 2.2 km || 
|-id=621 bgcolor=#fefefe
| 44621 ||  || — || September 7, 1999 || Socorro || LINEAR || — || align=right | 2.1 km || 
|-id=622 bgcolor=#fefefe
| 44622 ||  || — || September 7, 1999 || Socorro || LINEAR || — || align=right | 1.8 km || 
|-id=623 bgcolor=#fefefe
| 44623 ||  || — || September 7, 1999 || Socorro || LINEAR || — || align=right | 3.1 km || 
|-id=624 bgcolor=#fefefe
| 44624 ||  || — || September 7, 1999 || Socorro || LINEAR || — || align=right | 1.7 km || 
|-id=625 bgcolor=#d6d6d6
| 44625 ||  || — || September 7, 1999 || Socorro || LINEAR || — || align=right | 6.8 km || 
|-id=626 bgcolor=#fefefe
| 44626 ||  || — || September 7, 1999 || Socorro || LINEAR || FLO || align=right | 1.9 km || 
|-id=627 bgcolor=#fefefe
| 44627 ||  || — || September 7, 1999 || Socorro || LINEAR || — || align=right | 3.5 km || 
|-id=628 bgcolor=#fefefe
| 44628 ||  || — || September 7, 1999 || Socorro || LINEAR || FLO || align=right | 1.6 km || 
|-id=629 bgcolor=#fefefe
| 44629 ||  || — || September 7, 1999 || Socorro || LINEAR || FLO || align=right | 2.0 km || 
|-id=630 bgcolor=#fefefe
| 44630 ||  || — || September 7, 1999 || Socorro || LINEAR || V || align=right | 1.4 km || 
|-id=631 bgcolor=#E9E9E9
| 44631 ||  || — || September 7, 1999 || Socorro || LINEAR || — || align=right | 3.0 km || 
|-id=632 bgcolor=#fefefe
| 44632 ||  || — || September 7, 1999 || Socorro || LINEAR || — || align=right | 2.8 km || 
|-id=633 bgcolor=#fefefe
| 44633 ||  || — || September 7, 1999 || Socorro || LINEAR || V || align=right | 2.5 km || 
|-id=634 bgcolor=#fefefe
| 44634 ||  || — || September 7, 1999 || Socorro || LINEAR || — || align=right | 1.9 km || 
|-id=635 bgcolor=#fefefe
| 44635 ||  || — || September 7, 1999 || Socorro || LINEAR || FLO || align=right | 1.7 km || 
|-id=636 bgcolor=#fefefe
| 44636 ||  || — || September 8, 1999 || Socorro || LINEAR || V || align=right | 2.1 km || 
|-id=637 bgcolor=#fefefe
| 44637 ||  || — || September 8, 1999 || Socorro || LINEAR || FLO || align=right | 2.3 km || 
|-id=638 bgcolor=#fefefe
| 44638 ||  || — || September 8, 1999 || Socorro || LINEAR || — || align=right | 1.6 km || 
|-id=639 bgcolor=#fefefe
| 44639 ||  || — || September 8, 1999 || Socorro || LINEAR || V || align=right | 2.0 km || 
|-id=640 bgcolor=#fefefe
| 44640 ||  || — || September 8, 1999 || Socorro || LINEAR || — || align=right | 2.4 km || 
|-id=641 bgcolor=#fefefe
| 44641 ||  || — || September 9, 1999 || Socorro || LINEAR || H || align=right | 1.3 km || 
|-id=642 bgcolor=#fefefe
| 44642 ||  || — || September 9, 1999 || Socorro || LINEAR || — || align=right | 1.7 km || 
|-id=643 bgcolor=#fefefe
| 44643 ||  || — || September 9, 1999 || Socorro || LINEAR || FLO || align=right | 2.1 km || 
|-id=644 bgcolor=#fefefe
| 44644 ||  || — || September 9, 1999 || Socorro || LINEAR || — || align=right | 2.5 km || 
|-id=645 bgcolor=#fefefe
| 44645 ||  || — || September 9, 1999 || Socorro || LINEAR || V || align=right | 2.1 km || 
|-id=646 bgcolor=#fefefe
| 44646 ||  || — || September 9, 1999 || Socorro || LINEAR || V || align=right | 1.4 km || 
|-id=647 bgcolor=#E9E9E9
| 44647 ||  || — || September 9, 1999 || Socorro || LINEAR || — || align=right | 3.4 km || 
|-id=648 bgcolor=#fefefe
| 44648 ||  || — || September 9, 1999 || Socorro || LINEAR || NYS || align=right | 1.9 km || 
|-id=649 bgcolor=#fefefe
| 44649 ||  || — || September 9, 1999 || Socorro || LINEAR || — || align=right | 1.5 km || 
|-id=650 bgcolor=#fefefe
| 44650 ||  || — || September 9, 1999 || Socorro || LINEAR || — || align=right | 1.9 km || 
|-id=651 bgcolor=#fefefe
| 44651 ||  || — || September 9, 1999 || Socorro || LINEAR || FLO || align=right | 1.8 km || 
|-id=652 bgcolor=#fefefe
| 44652 ||  || — || September 9, 1999 || Socorro || LINEAR || — || align=right | 2.4 km || 
|-id=653 bgcolor=#fefefe
| 44653 ||  || — || September 9, 1999 || Socorro || LINEAR || — || align=right | 3.6 km || 
|-id=654 bgcolor=#fefefe
| 44654 ||  || — || September 9, 1999 || Socorro || LINEAR || — || align=right | 2.1 km || 
|-id=655 bgcolor=#fefefe
| 44655 ||  || — || September 9, 1999 || Socorro || LINEAR || — || align=right | 2.0 km || 
|-id=656 bgcolor=#fefefe
| 44656 ||  || — || September 9, 1999 || Socorro || LINEAR || — || align=right | 3.5 km || 
|-id=657 bgcolor=#fefefe
| 44657 ||  || — || September 9, 1999 || Socorro || LINEAR || — || align=right | 3.5 km || 
|-id=658 bgcolor=#fefefe
| 44658 ||  || — || September 9, 1999 || Socorro || LINEAR || — || align=right | 1.7 km || 
|-id=659 bgcolor=#fefefe
| 44659 ||  || — || September 9, 1999 || Socorro || LINEAR || V || align=right | 1.7 km || 
|-id=660 bgcolor=#fefefe
| 44660 ||  || — || September 9, 1999 || Socorro || LINEAR || — || align=right | 2.4 km || 
|-id=661 bgcolor=#fefefe
| 44661 ||  || — || September 9, 1999 || Socorro || LINEAR || — || align=right | 2.5 km || 
|-id=662 bgcolor=#fefefe
| 44662 ||  || — || September 9, 1999 || Socorro || LINEAR || — || align=right | 1.4 km || 
|-id=663 bgcolor=#fefefe
| 44663 ||  || — || September 9, 1999 || Socorro || LINEAR || V || align=right | 1.9 km || 
|-id=664 bgcolor=#fefefe
| 44664 ||  || — || September 9, 1999 || Socorro || LINEAR || — || align=right | 2.2 km || 
|-id=665 bgcolor=#fefefe
| 44665 ||  || — || September 9, 1999 || Socorro || LINEAR || NYS || align=right | 1.9 km || 
|-id=666 bgcolor=#fefefe
| 44666 ||  || — || September 9, 1999 || Socorro || LINEAR || — || align=right | 1.8 km || 
|-id=667 bgcolor=#fefefe
| 44667 ||  || — || September 9, 1999 || Socorro || LINEAR || V || align=right | 1.7 km || 
|-id=668 bgcolor=#fefefe
| 44668 ||  || — || September 9, 1999 || Socorro || LINEAR || — || align=right | 2.3 km || 
|-id=669 bgcolor=#fefefe
| 44669 ||  || — || September 9, 1999 || Socorro || LINEAR || fast? || align=right | 2.2 km || 
|-id=670 bgcolor=#fefefe
| 44670 ||  || — || September 9, 1999 || Socorro || LINEAR || — || align=right | 1.5 km || 
|-id=671 bgcolor=#fefefe
| 44671 ||  || — || September 9, 1999 || Socorro || LINEAR || — || align=right | 1.9 km || 
|-id=672 bgcolor=#fefefe
| 44672 ||  || — || September 9, 1999 || Socorro || LINEAR || — || align=right | 3.0 km || 
|-id=673 bgcolor=#fefefe
| 44673 ||  || — || September 9, 1999 || Socorro || LINEAR || — || align=right | 3.3 km || 
|-id=674 bgcolor=#fefefe
| 44674 ||  || — || September 9, 1999 || Socorro || LINEAR || — || align=right | 1.9 km || 
|-id=675 bgcolor=#fefefe
| 44675 ||  || — || September 9, 1999 || Socorro || LINEAR || — || align=right | 2.4 km || 
|-id=676 bgcolor=#fefefe
| 44676 ||  || — || September 9, 1999 || Socorro || LINEAR || FLO || align=right | 2.3 km || 
|-id=677 bgcolor=#fefefe
| 44677 ||  || — || September 10, 1999 || Socorro || LINEAR || — || align=right | 2.2 km || 
|-id=678 bgcolor=#fefefe
| 44678 ||  || — || September 13, 1999 || Socorro || LINEAR || V || align=right | 1.6 km || 
|-id=679 bgcolor=#fefefe
| 44679 ||  || — || September 15, 1999 || Kitt Peak || Spacewatch || — || align=right | 3.1 km || 
|-id=680 bgcolor=#fefefe
| 44680 ||  || — || September 7, 1999 || Socorro || LINEAR || FLO || align=right | 2.8 km || 
|-id=681 bgcolor=#fefefe
| 44681 ||  || — || September 8, 1999 || Socorro || LINEAR || V || align=right | 1.8 km || 
|-id=682 bgcolor=#fefefe
| 44682 ||  || — || September 8, 1999 || Socorro || LINEAR || — || align=right | 3.7 km || 
|-id=683 bgcolor=#fefefe
| 44683 ||  || — || September 8, 1999 || Socorro || LINEAR || slow || align=right | 3.7 km || 
|-id=684 bgcolor=#fefefe
| 44684 ||  || — || September 8, 1999 || Socorro || LINEAR || — || align=right | 2.5 km || 
|-id=685 bgcolor=#E9E9E9
| 44685 ||  || — || September 8, 1999 || Socorro || LINEAR || — || align=right | 4.3 km || 
|-id=686 bgcolor=#fefefe
| 44686 ||  || — || September 8, 1999 || Socorro || LINEAR || — || align=right | 5.1 km || 
|-id=687 bgcolor=#E9E9E9
| 44687 ||  || — || September 8, 1999 || Socorro || LINEAR || EUN || align=right | 3.7 km || 
|-id=688 bgcolor=#fefefe
| 44688 ||  || — || September 8, 1999 || Socorro || LINEAR || — || align=right | 2.6 km || 
|-id=689 bgcolor=#fefefe
| 44689 ||  || — || September 8, 1999 || Socorro || LINEAR || — || align=right | 5.4 km || 
|-id=690 bgcolor=#fefefe
| 44690 ||  || — || September 8, 1999 || Socorro || LINEAR || — || align=right | 2.6 km || 
|-id=691 bgcolor=#fefefe
| 44691 ||  || — || September 5, 1999 || Anderson Mesa || LONEOS || V || align=right | 2.6 km || 
|-id=692 bgcolor=#fefefe
| 44692 ||  || — || September 7, 1999 || Socorro || LINEAR || FLO || align=right | 2.2 km || 
|-id=693 bgcolor=#fefefe
| 44693 ||  || — || September 8, 1999 || Catalina || CSS || V || align=right | 1.7 km || 
|-id=694 bgcolor=#fefefe
| 44694 ||  || — || September 8, 1999 || Catalina || CSS || FLO || align=right | 2.0 km || 
|-id=695 bgcolor=#fefefe
| 44695 ||  || — || September 8, 1999 || Catalina || CSS || — || align=right | 2.9 km || 
|-id=696 bgcolor=#fefefe
| 44696 ||  || — || September 8, 1999 || Catalina || CSS || — || align=right | 2.5 km || 
|-id=697 bgcolor=#fefefe
| 44697 ||  || — || September 8, 1999 || Catalina || CSS || — || align=right | 2.2 km || 
|-id=698 bgcolor=#fefefe
| 44698 ||  || — || September 5, 1999 || Anderson Mesa || LONEOS || V || align=right | 2.0 km || 
|-id=699 bgcolor=#fefefe
| 44699 || 1999 SG || — || September 16, 1999 || Višnjan Observatory || K. Korlević || FLO || align=right | 3.1 km || 
|-id=700 bgcolor=#fefefe
| 44700 ||  || — || September 22, 1999 || Socorro || LINEAR || PHO || align=right | 10 km || 
|}

44701–44800 

|-bgcolor=#fefefe
| 44701 ||  || — || September 29, 1999 || Socorro || LINEAR || V || align=right | 3.1 km || 
|-id=702 bgcolor=#fefefe
| 44702 ||  || — || September 29, 1999 || Socorro || LINEAR || — || align=right | 2.9 km || 
|-id=703 bgcolor=#fefefe
| 44703 ||  || — || September 30, 1999 || Catalina || CSS || V || align=right | 2.1 km || 
|-id=704 bgcolor=#fefefe
| 44704 ||  || — || September 30, 1999 || Catalina || CSS || — || align=right | 3.5 km || 
|-id=705 bgcolor=#fefefe
| 44705 ||  || — || September 30, 1999 || Catalina || CSS || V || align=right | 3.1 km || 
|-id=706 bgcolor=#E9E9E9
| 44706 ||  || — || September 30, 1999 || Catalina || CSS || — || align=right | 2.2 km || 
|-id=707 bgcolor=#fefefe
| 44707 ||  || — || October 1, 1999 || Višnjan Observatory || K. Korlević || V || align=right | 1.9 km || 
|-id=708 bgcolor=#fefefe
| 44708 ||  || — || October 1, 1999 || Višnjan Observatory || K. Korlević || — || align=right | 2.4 km || 
|-id=709 bgcolor=#fefefe
| 44709 ||  || — || October 1, 1999 || Višnjan Observatory || K. Korlević || NYS || align=right | 2.1 km || 
|-id=710 bgcolor=#fefefe
| 44710 ||  || — || October 4, 1999 || Prescott || P. G. Comba || — || align=right | 2.0 km || 
|-id=711 bgcolor=#fefefe
| 44711 Carp ||  ||  || October 3, 1999 || Kuma Kogen || A. Nakamura || — || align=right | 2.4 km || 
|-id=712 bgcolor=#fefefe
| 44712 ||  || — || October 4, 1999 || Ondřejov || L. Kotková || FLO || align=right | 2.2 km || 
|-id=713 bgcolor=#fefefe
| 44713 ||  || — || October 1, 1999 || Višnjan Observatory || K. Korlević, M. Jurić || — || align=right | 1.9 km || 
|-id=714 bgcolor=#fefefe
| 44714 ||  || — || October 6, 1999 || High Point || D. K. Chesney || — || align=right | 2.0 km || 
|-id=715 bgcolor=#fefefe
| 44715 ||  || — || October 2, 1999 || San Marcello || A. Boattini, M. Tombelli || FLO || align=right | 1.8 km || 
|-id=716 bgcolor=#fefefe
| 44716 ||  || — || October 3, 1999 || Catalina || CSS || — || align=right | 2.6 km || 
|-id=717 bgcolor=#fefefe
| 44717 Borgoamozzano ||  ||  || October 7, 1999 || Monte Agliale || S. Donati || — || align=right | 2.9 km || 
|-id=718 bgcolor=#fefefe
| 44718 ||  || — || October 7, 1999 || Višnjan Observatory || K. Korlević, M. Jurić || — || align=right | 2.3 km || 
|-id=719 bgcolor=#fefefe
| 44719 ||  || — || October 8, 1999 || Višnjan Observatory || K. Korlević, M. Jurić || NYS || align=right | 2.4 km || 
|-id=720 bgcolor=#fefefe
| 44720 ||  || — || October 8, 1999 || Višnjan Observatory || K. Korlević, M. Jurić || FLO || align=right | 2.5 km || 
|-id=721 bgcolor=#fefefe
| 44721 ||  || — || October 8, 1999 || Prescott || P. G. Comba || NYS || align=right | 3.1 km || 
|-id=722 bgcolor=#fefefe
| 44722 ||  || — || October 6, 1999 || Višnjan Observatory || K. Korlević, M. Jurić || — || align=right | 3.8 km || 
|-id=723 bgcolor=#fefefe
| 44723 ||  || — || October 12, 1999 || Prescott || P. G. Comba || — || align=right | 3.9 km || 
|-id=724 bgcolor=#fefefe
| 44724 ||  || — || October 11, 1999 || Črni Vrh || Črni Vrh || V || align=right | 1.7 km || 
|-id=725 bgcolor=#fefefe
| 44725 ||  || — || October 13, 1999 || Prescott || P. G. Comba || V || align=right | 1.4 km || 
|-id=726 bgcolor=#fefefe
| 44726 ||  || — || October 7, 1999 || Višnjan Observatory || K. Korlević, M. Jurić || NYS || align=right | 2.7 km || 
|-id=727 bgcolor=#fefefe
| 44727 ||  || — || October 12, 1999 || Fountain Hills || C. W. Juels || — || align=right | 2.6 km || 
|-id=728 bgcolor=#E9E9E9
| 44728 ||  || — || October 13, 1999 || Ondřejov || P. Kušnirák, P. Pravec || — || align=right | 6.2 km || 
|-id=729 bgcolor=#fefefe
| 44729 ||  || — || October 15, 1999 || Višnjan Observatory || K. Korlević || — || align=right | 5.4 km || 
|-id=730 bgcolor=#fefefe
| 44730 ||  || — || October 4, 1999 || Xinglong || SCAP || — || align=right | 2.4 km || 
|-id=731 bgcolor=#fefefe
| 44731 ||  || — || October 10, 1999 || Xinglong || SCAP || — || align=right | 1.9 km || 
|-id=732 bgcolor=#fefefe
| 44732 ||  || — || October 14, 1999 || Xinglong || SCAP || — || align=right | 4.0 km || 
|-id=733 bgcolor=#fefefe
| 44733 ||  || — || October 14, 1999 || Xinglong || SCAP || NYS || align=right | 2.1 km || 
|-id=734 bgcolor=#fefefe
| 44734 ||  || — || October 3, 1999 || Socorro || LINEAR || V || align=right | 1.7 km || 
|-id=735 bgcolor=#E9E9E9
| 44735 ||  || — || October 3, 1999 || Socorro || LINEAR || — || align=right | 3.6 km || 
|-id=736 bgcolor=#fefefe
| 44736 ||  || — || October 4, 1999 || Socorro || LINEAR || NYS || align=right | 2.4 km || 
|-id=737 bgcolor=#E9E9E9
| 44737 ||  || — || October 4, 1999 || Socorro || LINEAR || GEF || align=right | 2.7 km || 
|-id=738 bgcolor=#fefefe
| 44738 ||  || — || October 4, 1999 || Socorro || LINEAR || PHO || align=right | 2.7 km || 
|-id=739 bgcolor=#fefefe
| 44739 ||  || — || October 15, 1999 || Anderson Mesa || LONEOS || — || align=right | 1.9 km || 
|-id=740 bgcolor=#E9E9E9
| 44740 ||  || — || October 13, 1999 || Anderson Mesa || LONEOS || RAF || align=right | 3.8 km || 
|-id=741 bgcolor=#fefefe
| 44741 ||  || — || October 1, 1999 || Catalina || CSS || FLO || align=right | 1.9 km || 
|-id=742 bgcolor=#fefefe
| 44742 ||  || — || October 5, 1999 || Catalina || CSS || — || align=right | 2.3 km || 
|-id=743 bgcolor=#fefefe
| 44743 ||  || — || October 4, 1999 || Kitt Peak || Spacewatch || NYS || align=right | 2.8 km || 
|-id=744 bgcolor=#fefefe
| 44744 ||  || — || October 4, 1999 || Kitt Peak || Spacewatch || NYS || align=right | 5.4 km || 
|-id=745 bgcolor=#fefefe
| 44745 ||  || — || October 6, 1999 || Kitt Peak || Spacewatch || V || align=right | 1.2 km || 
|-id=746 bgcolor=#E9E9E9
| 44746 ||  || — || October 7, 1999 || Kitt Peak || Spacewatch || DOR || align=right | 4.9 km || 
|-id=747 bgcolor=#fefefe
| 44747 ||  || — || October 11, 1999 || Kitt Peak || Spacewatch || — || align=right | 3.8 km || 
|-id=748 bgcolor=#E9E9E9
| 44748 ||  || — || October 15, 1999 || Kitt Peak || Spacewatch || HEN || align=right | 2.0 km || 
|-id=749 bgcolor=#fefefe
| 44749 ||  || — || October 2, 1999 || Socorro || LINEAR || V || align=right | 1.6 km || 
|-id=750 bgcolor=#fefefe
| 44750 ||  || — || October 2, 1999 || Socorro || LINEAR || V || align=right | 1.4 km || 
|-id=751 bgcolor=#fefefe
| 44751 ||  || — || October 2, 1999 || Socorro || LINEAR || — || align=right | 6.3 km || 
|-id=752 bgcolor=#fefefe
| 44752 ||  || — || October 2, 1999 || Socorro || LINEAR || — || align=right | 2.3 km || 
|-id=753 bgcolor=#E9E9E9
| 44753 ||  || — || October 2, 1999 || Socorro || LINEAR || MAR || align=right | 3.9 km || 
|-id=754 bgcolor=#fefefe
| 44754 ||  || — || October 3, 1999 || Socorro || LINEAR || FLO || align=right | 2.0 km || 
|-id=755 bgcolor=#fefefe
| 44755 ||  || — || October 15, 1999 || Socorro || LINEAR || — || align=right | 1.7 km || 
|-id=756 bgcolor=#fefefe
| 44756 ||  || — || October 4, 1999 || Socorro || LINEAR || — || align=right | 1.9 km || 
|-id=757 bgcolor=#fefefe
| 44757 ||  || — || October 4, 1999 || Socorro || LINEAR || FLO || align=right | 1.7 km || 
|-id=758 bgcolor=#fefefe
| 44758 ||  || — || October 4, 1999 || Socorro || LINEAR || FLO || align=right | 2.1 km || 
|-id=759 bgcolor=#fefefe
| 44759 ||  || — || October 4, 1999 || Socorro || LINEAR || V || align=right | 1.9 km || 
|-id=760 bgcolor=#fefefe
| 44760 ||  || — || October 4, 1999 || Socorro || LINEAR || FLO || align=right | 1.8 km || 
|-id=761 bgcolor=#fefefe
| 44761 ||  || — || October 4, 1999 || Socorro || LINEAR || V || align=right | 2.0 km || 
|-id=762 bgcolor=#fefefe
| 44762 ||  || — || October 4, 1999 || Socorro || LINEAR || V || align=right | 2.5 km || 
|-id=763 bgcolor=#fefefe
| 44763 ||  || — || October 4, 1999 || Socorro || LINEAR || — || align=right | 2.4 km || 
|-id=764 bgcolor=#fefefe
| 44764 ||  || — || October 4, 1999 || Socorro || LINEAR || — || align=right | 2.9 km || 
|-id=765 bgcolor=#fefefe
| 44765 ||  || — || October 4, 1999 || Socorro || LINEAR || FLO || align=right | 1.5 km || 
|-id=766 bgcolor=#fefefe
| 44766 ||  || — || October 4, 1999 || Socorro || LINEAR || ERI || align=right | 6.1 km || 
|-id=767 bgcolor=#fefefe
| 44767 ||  || — || October 4, 1999 || Socorro || LINEAR || — || align=right | 2.0 km || 
|-id=768 bgcolor=#fefefe
| 44768 ||  || — || October 4, 1999 || Socorro || LINEAR || — || align=right | 3.3 km || 
|-id=769 bgcolor=#fefefe
| 44769 ||  || — || October 6, 1999 || Socorro || LINEAR || — || align=right | 1.4 km || 
|-id=770 bgcolor=#fefefe
| 44770 ||  || — || October 6, 1999 || Socorro || LINEAR || — || align=right | 2.0 km || 
|-id=771 bgcolor=#fefefe
| 44771 ||  || — || October 6, 1999 || Socorro || LINEAR || NYS || align=right | 5.7 km || 
|-id=772 bgcolor=#fefefe
| 44772 ||  || — || October 6, 1999 || Socorro || LINEAR || V || align=right | 1.4 km || 
|-id=773 bgcolor=#fefefe
| 44773 ||  || — || October 6, 1999 || Socorro || LINEAR || SUL || align=right | 3.4 km || 
|-id=774 bgcolor=#fefefe
| 44774 ||  || — || October 6, 1999 || Socorro || LINEAR || FLO || align=right | 1.4 km || 
|-id=775 bgcolor=#fefefe
| 44775 ||  || — || October 7, 1999 || Socorro || LINEAR || V || align=right | 1.9 km || 
|-id=776 bgcolor=#fefefe
| 44776 ||  || — || October 7, 1999 || Socorro || LINEAR || — || align=right | 2.0 km || 
|-id=777 bgcolor=#fefefe
| 44777 ||  || — || October 7, 1999 || Socorro || LINEAR || — || align=right | 2.8 km || 
|-id=778 bgcolor=#fefefe
| 44778 ||  || — || October 7, 1999 || Socorro || LINEAR || FLO || align=right | 1.9 km || 
|-id=779 bgcolor=#fefefe
| 44779 ||  || — || October 7, 1999 || Socorro || LINEAR || V || align=right | 1.8 km || 
|-id=780 bgcolor=#fefefe
| 44780 ||  || — || October 7, 1999 || Socorro || LINEAR || — || align=right | 1.9 km || 
|-id=781 bgcolor=#fefefe
| 44781 ||  || — || October 7, 1999 || Socorro || LINEAR || V || align=right | 2.1 km || 
|-id=782 bgcolor=#fefefe
| 44782 ||  || — || October 7, 1999 || Socorro || LINEAR || FLO || align=right | 2.0 km || 
|-id=783 bgcolor=#fefefe
| 44783 ||  || — || October 9, 1999 || Socorro || LINEAR || V || align=right | 2.3 km || 
|-id=784 bgcolor=#fefefe
| 44784 ||  || — || October 10, 1999 || Socorro || LINEAR || — || align=right | 1.8 km || 
|-id=785 bgcolor=#fefefe
| 44785 ||  || — || October 10, 1999 || Socorro || LINEAR || — || align=right | 1.6 km || 
|-id=786 bgcolor=#fefefe
| 44786 ||  || — || October 10, 1999 || Socorro || LINEAR || — || align=right | 4.6 km || 
|-id=787 bgcolor=#fefefe
| 44787 ||  || — || October 10, 1999 || Socorro || LINEAR || — || align=right | 3.4 km || 
|-id=788 bgcolor=#fefefe
| 44788 ||  || — || October 10, 1999 || Socorro || LINEAR || FLO || align=right | 2.2 km || 
|-id=789 bgcolor=#fefefe
| 44789 ||  || — || October 10, 1999 || Socorro || LINEAR || FLO || align=right | 2.2 km || 
|-id=790 bgcolor=#E9E9E9
| 44790 ||  || — || October 10, 1999 || Socorro || LINEAR || ADE || align=right | 6.5 km || 
|-id=791 bgcolor=#fefefe
| 44791 ||  || — || October 10, 1999 || Socorro || LINEAR || NYS || align=right | 1.5 km || 
|-id=792 bgcolor=#E9E9E9
| 44792 ||  || — || October 10, 1999 || Socorro || LINEAR || — || align=right | 2.8 km || 
|-id=793 bgcolor=#fefefe
| 44793 ||  || — || October 10, 1999 || Socorro || LINEAR || V || align=right | 1.6 km || 
|-id=794 bgcolor=#fefefe
| 44794 ||  || — || October 10, 1999 || Socorro || LINEAR || — || align=right | 2.0 km || 
|-id=795 bgcolor=#fefefe
| 44795 ||  || — || October 10, 1999 || Socorro || LINEAR || NYS || align=right | 2.0 km || 
|-id=796 bgcolor=#fefefe
| 44796 ||  || — || October 10, 1999 || Socorro || LINEAR || — || align=right | 3.1 km || 
|-id=797 bgcolor=#fefefe
| 44797 ||  || — || October 10, 1999 || Socorro || LINEAR || NYS || align=right | 2.0 km || 
|-id=798 bgcolor=#fefefe
| 44798 ||  || — || October 12, 1999 || Socorro || LINEAR || — || align=right | 3.3 km || 
|-id=799 bgcolor=#fefefe
| 44799 ||  || — || October 12, 1999 || Socorro || LINEAR || V || align=right | 1.8 km || 
|-id=800 bgcolor=#E9E9E9
| 44800 ||  || — || October 12, 1999 || Socorro || LINEAR || — || align=right | 2.8 km || 
|}

44801–44900 

|-bgcolor=#fefefe
| 44801 ||  || — || October 12, 1999 || Socorro || LINEAR || FLO || align=right | 1.6 km || 
|-id=802 bgcolor=#fefefe
| 44802 ||  || — || October 13, 1999 || Socorro || LINEAR || — || align=right | 1.8 km || 
|-id=803 bgcolor=#E9E9E9
| 44803 ||  || — || October 13, 1999 || Socorro || LINEAR || — || align=right | 2.0 km || 
|-id=804 bgcolor=#E9E9E9
| 44804 ||  || — || October 14, 1999 || Socorro || LINEAR || ADE || align=right | 9.4 km || 
|-id=805 bgcolor=#fefefe
| 44805 ||  || — || October 15, 1999 || Socorro || LINEAR || V || align=right | 1.4 km || 
|-id=806 bgcolor=#fefefe
| 44806 ||  || — || October 15, 1999 || Socorro || LINEAR || NYS || align=right | 2.3 km || 
|-id=807 bgcolor=#fefefe
| 44807 ||  || — || October 15, 1999 || Socorro || LINEAR || FLO || align=right | 1.9 km || 
|-id=808 bgcolor=#fefefe
| 44808 ||  || — || October 1, 1999 || Catalina || CSS || FLO || align=right | 1.7 km || 
|-id=809 bgcolor=#fefefe
| 44809 ||  || — || October 2, 1999 || Socorro || LINEAR || FLO || align=right | 1.8 km || 
|-id=810 bgcolor=#fefefe
| 44810 ||  || — || October 2, 1999 || Anderson Mesa || LONEOS || — || align=right | 3.7 km || 
|-id=811 bgcolor=#E9E9E9
| 44811 ||  || — || October 2, 1999 || Anderson Mesa || LONEOS || — || align=right | 2.6 km || 
|-id=812 bgcolor=#fefefe
| 44812 ||  || — || October 2, 1999 || Anderson Mesa || LONEOS || FLO || align=right | 1.9 km || 
|-id=813 bgcolor=#fefefe
| 44813 ||  || — || October 2, 1999 || Socorro || LINEAR || — || align=right | 2.5 km || 
|-id=814 bgcolor=#fefefe
| 44814 ||  || — || October 2, 1999 || Socorro || LINEAR || — || align=right | 2.2 km || 
|-id=815 bgcolor=#fefefe
| 44815 ||  || — || October 2, 1999 || Socorro || LINEAR || — || align=right | 2.3 km || 
|-id=816 bgcolor=#fefefe
| 44816 ||  || — || October 4, 1999 || Anderson Mesa || LONEOS || — || align=right | 2.6 km || 
|-id=817 bgcolor=#fefefe
| 44817 ||  || — || October 3, 1999 || Catalina || CSS || FLO || align=right | 1.7 km || 
|-id=818 bgcolor=#fefefe
| 44818 ||  || — || October 3, 1999 || Catalina || CSS || FLO || align=right | 1.5 km || 
|-id=819 bgcolor=#fefefe
| 44819 ||  || — || October 3, 1999 || Catalina || CSS || — || align=right | 2.4 km || 
|-id=820 bgcolor=#E9E9E9
| 44820 ||  || — || October 3, 1999 || Catalina || CSS || — || align=right | 4.4 km || 
|-id=821 bgcolor=#fefefe
| 44821 Amadora ||  ||  || October 3, 1999 || Catalina || CSS || — || align=right | 4.9 km || 
|-id=822 bgcolor=#fefefe
| 44822 ||  || — || October 4, 1999 || Catalina || CSS || V || align=right | 2.6 km || 
|-id=823 bgcolor=#fefefe
| 44823 ||  || — || October 4, 1999 || Catalina || CSS || — || align=right | 2.4 km || 
|-id=824 bgcolor=#E9E9E9
| 44824 ||  || — || October 6, 1999 || Socorro || LINEAR || — || align=right | 5.7 km || 
|-id=825 bgcolor=#fefefe
| 44825 ||  || — || October 12, 1999 || Socorro || LINEAR || PHO || align=right | 3.2 km || 
|-id=826 bgcolor=#fefefe
| 44826 ||  || — || October 7, 1999 || Catalina || CSS || — || align=right | 2.1 km || 
|-id=827 bgcolor=#E9E9E9
| 44827 ||  || — || October 8, 1999 || Catalina || CSS || — || align=right | 4.2 km || 
|-id=828 bgcolor=#fefefe
| 44828 ||  || — || October 8, 1999 || Catalina || CSS || — || align=right | 2.1 km || 
|-id=829 bgcolor=#fefefe
| 44829 ||  || — || October 8, 1999 || Catalina || CSS || — || align=right | 2.1 km || 
|-id=830 bgcolor=#fefefe
| 44830 ||  || — || October 8, 1999 || Catalina || CSS || FLO || align=right | 2.1 km || 
|-id=831 bgcolor=#fefefe
| 44831 ||  || — || October 8, 1999 || Catalina || CSS || V || align=right | 1.4 km || 
|-id=832 bgcolor=#fefefe
| 44832 ||  || — || October 8, 1999 || Catalina || CSS || NYS || align=right | 1.4 km || 
|-id=833 bgcolor=#fefefe
| 44833 ||  || — || October 8, 1999 || Catalina || CSS || — || align=right | 4.3 km || 
|-id=834 bgcolor=#fefefe
| 44834 ||  || — || October 9, 1999 || Socorro || LINEAR || — || align=right | 1.8 km || 
|-id=835 bgcolor=#fefefe
| 44835 ||  || — || October 9, 1999 || Socorro || LINEAR || MAS || align=right | 2.0 km || 
|-id=836 bgcolor=#fefefe
| 44836 ||  || — || October 13, 1999 || Socorro || LINEAR || NYS || align=right | 1.5 km || 
|-id=837 bgcolor=#E9E9E9
| 44837 ||  || — || October 3, 1999 || Socorro || LINEAR || — || align=right | 3.5 km || 
|-id=838 bgcolor=#fefefe
| 44838 ||  || — || October 3, 1999 || Socorro || LINEAR || — || align=right | 2.8 km || 
|-id=839 bgcolor=#E9E9E9
| 44839 ||  || — || October 5, 1999 || Socorro || LINEAR || KRM || align=right | 8.4 km || 
|-id=840 bgcolor=#fefefe
| 44840 ||  || — || October 9, 1999 || Socorro || LINEAR || V || align=right | 1.7 km || 
|-id=841 bgcolor=#fefefe
| 44841 ||  || — || October 9, 1999 || Socorro || LINEAR || — || align=right | 1.8 km || 
|-id=842 bgcolor=#fefefe
| 44842 ||  || — || October 9, 1999 || Socorro || LINEAR || — || align=right | 2.1 km || 
|-id=843 bgcolor=#fefefe
| 44843 ||  || — || October 10, 1999 || Socorro || LINEAR || — || align=right | 1.7 km || 
|-id=844 bgcolor=#fefefe
| 44844 ||  || — || October 10, 1999 || Socorro || LINEAR || V || align=right | 2.1 km || 
|-id=845 bgcolor=#E9E9E9
| 44845 ||  || — || October 10, 1999 || Socorro || LINEAR || WIT || align=right | 2.1 km || 
|-id=846 bgcolor=#E9E9E9
| 44846 ||  || — || October 10, 1999 || Socorro || LINEAR || EUN || align=right | 3.7 km || 
|-id=847 bgcolor=#E9E9E9
| 44847 ||  || — || October 10, 1999 || Socorro || LINEAR || — || align=right | 3.3 km || 
|-id=848 bgcolor=#E9E9E9
| 44848 ||  || — || October 10, 1999 || Socorro || LINEAR || EUN || align=right | 4.0 km || 
|-id=849 bgcolor=#fefefe
| 44849 ||  || — || October 16, 1999 || Višnjan Observatory || K. Korlević || — || align=right | 2.5 km || 
|-id=850 bgcolor=#fefefe
| 44850 ||  || — || October 17, 1999 || Oohira || T. Urata || FLO || align=right | 1.9 km || 
|-id=851 bgcolor=#fefefe
| 44851 ||  || — || October 16, 1999 || Višnjan Observatory || K. Korlević || FLO || align=right | 2.2 km || 
|-id=852 bgcolor=#fefefe
| 44852 ||  || — || October 17, 1999 || Višnjan Observatory || K. Korlević || NYS || align=right | 2.4 km || 
|-id=853 bgcolor=#E9E9E9
| 44853 ||  || — || October 31, 1999 || Ondřejov || L. Kotková || — || align=right | 2.9 km || 
|-id=854 bgcolor=#fefefe
| 44854 ||  || — || October 29, 1999 || Catalina || CSS || V || align=right | 3.7 km || 
|-id=855 bgcolor=#fefefe
| 44855 ||  || — || October 28, 1999 || Xinglong || SCAP || — || align=right | 1.5 km || 
|-id=856 bgcolor=#fefefe
| 44856 ||  || — || October 28, 1999 || Xinglong || SCAP || NYS || align=right | 3.9 km || 
|-id=857 bgcolor=#fefefe
| 44857 ||  || — || October 29, 1999 || Catalina || CSS || — || align=right | 2.6 km || 
|-id=858 bgcolor=#fefefe
| 44858 ||  || — || October 29, 1999 || Catalina || CSS || fast? || align=right | 1.6 km || 
|-id=859 bgcolor=#fefefe
| 44859 ||  || — || October 29, 1999 || Catalina || CSS || — || align=right | 2.0 km || 
|-id=860 bgcolor=#fefefe
| 44860 ||  || — || October 29, 1999 || Catalina || CSS || V || align=right | 1.5 km || 
|-id=861 bgcolor=#fefefe
| 44861 ||  || — || October 29, 1999 || Catalina || CSS || — || align=right | 3.5 km || 
|-id=862 bgcolor=#fefefe
| 44862 ||  || — || October 29, 1999 || Catalina || CSS || FLO || align=right | 2.8 km || 
|-id=863 bgcolor=#fefefe
| 44863 ||  || — || October 29, 1999 || Catalina || CSS || — || align=right | 2.8 km || 
|-id=864 bgcolor=#fefefe
| 44864 ||  || — || October 28, 1999 || Catalina || CSS || V || align=right | 1.9 km || 
|-id=865 bgcolor=#E9E9E9
| 44865 ||  || — || October 28, 1999 || Catalina || CSS || EUN || align=right | 2.8 km || 
|-id=866 bgcolor=#fefefe
| 44866 ||  || — || October 30, 1999 || Kitt Peak || Spacewatch || NYS || align=right | 2.0 km || 
|-id=867 bgcolor=#fefefe
| 44867 ||  || — || October 31, 1999 || Kitt Peak || Spacewatch || NYS || align=right | 2.1 km || 
|-id=868 bgcolor=#fefefe
| 44868 ||  || — || October 31, 1999 || Kitt Peak || Spacewatch || V || align=right | 2.0 km || 
|-id=869 bgcolor=#fefefe
| 44869 ||  || — || October 31, 1999 || Kitt Peak || Spacewatch || FLO || align=right | 1.8 km || 
|-id=870 bgcolor=#fefefe
| 44870 ||  || — || October 30, 1999 || Kitt Peak || Spacewatch || V || align=right | 2.0 km || 
|-id=871 bgcolor=#fefefe
| 44871 ||  || — || October 29, 1999 || Anderson Mesa || LONEOS || — || align=right | 3.6 km || 
|-id=872 bgcolor=#fefefe
| 44872 ||  || — || October 17, 1999 || Anderson Mesa || LONEOS || V || align=right | 2.1 km || 
|-id=873 bgcolor=#fefefe
| 44873 ||  || — || October 17, 1999 || Anderson Mesa || LONEOS || FLO || align=right | 1.6 km || 
|-id=874 bgcolor=#E9E9E9
| 44874 ||  || — || October 30, 1999 || Catalina || CSS || PAD || align=right | 5.4 km || 
|-id=875 bgcolor=#fefefe
| 44875 ||  || — || October 31, 1999 || Catalina || CSS || V || align=right | 2.0 km || 
|-id=876 bgcolor=#fefefe
| 44876 ||  || — || October 31, 1999 || Catalina || CSS || V || align=right | 1.4 km || 
|-id=877 bgcolor=#fefefe
| 44877 ||  || — || October 31, 1999 || Catalina || CSS || V || align=right | 1.7 km || 
|-id=878 bgcolor=#fefefe
| 44878 ||  || — || October 31, 1999 || Catalina || CSS || — || align=right | 2.4 km || 
|-id=879 bgcolor=#fefefe
| 44879 ||  || — || October 30, 1999 || Catalina || CSS || FLO || align=right | 3.2 km || 
|-id=880 bgcolor=#fefefe
| 44880 ||  || — || October 31, 1999 || Catalina || CSS || V || align=right | 1.7 km || 
|-id=881 bgcolor=#fefefe
| 44881 ||  || — || October 31, 1999 || Catalina || CSS || V || align=right | 1.5 km || 
|-id=882 bgcolor=#fefefe
| 44882 ||  || — || October 31, 1999 || Catalina || CSS || V || align=right | 1.2 km || 
|-id=883 bgcolor=#E9E9E9
| 44883 ||  || — || October 31, 1999 || Catalina || CSS || — || align=right | 4.3 km || 
|-id=884 bgcolor=#fefefe
| 44884 ||  || — || October 28, 1999 || Catalina || CSS || — || align=right | 1.7 km || 
|-id=885 bgcolor=#E9E9E9
| 44885 Vodička || 1999 VB ||  || November 1, 1999 || Kleť || J. Tichá, M. Tichý || — || align=right | 2.5 km || 
|-id=886 bgcolor=#fefefe
| 44886 ||  || — || November 4, 1999 || Zeno || T. Stafford || — || align=right | 5.0 km || 
|-id=887 bgcolor=#E9E9E9
| 44887 ||  || — || November 5, 1999 || Višnjan Observatory || K. Korlević || — || align=right | 2.9 km || 
|-id=888 bgcolor=#fefefe
| 44888 ||  || — || November 4, 1999 || Nachi-Katsuura || Y. Shimizu, T. Urata || — || align=right | 2.5 km || 
|-id=889 bgcolor=#fefefe
| 44889 ||  || — || November 5, 1999 || Oizumi || T. Kobayashi || — || align=right | 3.0 km || 
|-id=890 bgcolor=#fefefe
| 44890 ||  || — || November 7, 1999 || Višnjan Observatory || K. Korlević || — || align=right | 3.9 km || 
|-id=891 bgcolor=#fefefe
| 44891 ||  || — || November 8, 1999 || Višnjan Observatory || K. Korlević || NYS || align=right | 1.6 km || 
|-id=892 bgcolor=#E9E9E9
| 44892 ||  || — || November 8, 1999 || Višnjan Observatory || K. Korlević || — || align=right | 6.7 km || 
|-id=893 bgcolor=#fefefe
| 44893 ||  || — || November 5, 1999 || Farpoint || Farpoint Obs. || — || align=right | 1.9 km || 
|-id=894 bgcolor=#fefefe
| 44894 ||  || — || November 8, 1999 || Višnjan Observatory || K. Korlević || — || align=right | 2.5 km || 
|-id=895 bgcolor=#E9E9E9
| 44895 ||  || — || November 8, 1999 || Višnjan Observatory || K. Korlević || — || align=right | 7.1 km || 
|-id=896 bgcolor=#E9E9E9
| 44896 ||  || — || November 10, 1999 || Fountain Hills || C. W. Juels || — || align=right | 5.5 km || 
|-id=897 bgcolor=#E9E9E9
| 44897 ||  || — || November 11, 1999 || Fountain Hills || C. W. Juels || — || align=right | 3.4 km || 
|-id=898 bgcolor=#E9E9E9
| 44898 ||  || — || November 2, 1999 || Kitt Peak || Spacewatch || — || align=right | 2.0 km || 
|-id=899 bgcolor=#fefefe
| 44899 ||  || — || November 2, 1999 || Kitt Peak || Spacewatch || — || align=right | 2.4 km || 
|-id=900 bgcolor=#E9E9E9
| 44900 ||  || — || November 2, 1999 || Kitt Peak || Spacewatch || — || align=right | 2.9 km || 
|}

44901–45000 

|-bgcolor=#fefefe
| 44901 ||  || — || November 2, 1999 || Kitt Peak || Spacewatch || NYS || align=right | 1.1 km || 
|-id=902 bgcolor=#fefefe
| 44902 ||  || — || November 10, 1999 || Višnjan Observatory || K. Korlević || FLO || align=right | 2.1 km || 
|-id=903 bgcolor=#fefefe
| 44903 ||  || — || November 12, 1999 || Zeno || T. Stafford || — || align=right | 4.6 km || 
|-id=904 bgcolor=#E9E9E9
| 44904 ||  || — || November 12, 1999 || Višnjan Observatory || K. Korlević || ADE || align=right | 7.9 km || 
|-id=905 bgcolor=#fefefe
| 44905 ||  || — || November 13, 1999 || Fountain Hills || C. W. Juels || FLO || align=right | 2.4 km || 
|-id=906 bgcolor=#fefefe
| 44906 ||  || — || November 8, 1999 || Majorca || R. Pacheco, Á. López J. || — || align=right | 2.8 km || 
|-id=907 bgcolor=#fefefe
| 44907 ||  || — || November 15, 1999 || Fountain Hills || C. W. Juels || — || align=right | 6.6 km || 
|-id=908 bgcolor=#fefefe
| 44908 ||  || — || November 15, 1999 || Ondřejov || P. Kušnirák || — || align=right | 2.3 km || 
|-id=909 bgcolor=#fefefe
| 44909 ||  || — || November 13, 1999 || Oizumi || T. Kobayashi || — || align=right | 3.2 km || 
|-id=910 bgcolor=#fefefe
| 44910 ||  || — || November 13, 1999 || Oizumi || T. Kobayashi || — || align=right | 2.8 km || 
|-id=911 bgcolor=#fefefe
| 44911 ||  || — || November 13, 1999 || Oizumi || T. Kobayashi || — || align=right | 3.4 km || 
|-id=912 bgcolor=#fefefe
| 44912 ||  || — || November 13, 1999 || Oizumi || T. Kobayashi || — || align=right | 3.3 km || 
|-id=913 bgcolor=#E9E9E9
| 44913 ||  || — || November 3, 1999 || Socorro || LINEAR || — || align=right | 3.3 km || 
|-id=914 bgcolor=#fefefe
| 44914 ||  || — || November 3, 1999 || Catalina || CSS || FLO || align=right | 1.7 km || 
|-id=915 bgcolor=#fefefe
| 44915 ||  || — || November 3, 1999 || Catalina || CSS || FLO || align=right | 2.2 km || 
|-id=916 bgcolor=#fefefe
| 44916 ||  || — || November 3, 1999 || Socorro || LINEAR || — || align=right | 1.4 km || 
|-id=917 bgcolor=#fefefe
| 44917 ||  || — || November 3, 1999 || Socorro || LINEAR || V || align=right | 1.5 km || 
|-id=918 bgcolor=#fefefe
| 44918 ||  || — || November 3, 1999 || Socorro || LINEAR || — || align=right | 5.9 km || 
|-id=919 bgcolor=#fefefe
| 44919 ||  || — || November 3, 1999 || Socorro || LINEAR || FLO || align=right | 4.6 km || 
|-id=920 bgcolor=#fefefe
| 44920 ||  || — || November 3, 1999 || Socorro || LINEAR || MAS || align=right | 1.7 km || 
|-id=921 bgcolor=#E9E9E9
| 44921 ||  || — || November 3, 1999 || Socorro || LINEAR || AGN || align=right | 3.3 km || 
|-id=922 bgcolor=#fefefe
| 44922 ||  || — || November 3, 1999 || Socorro || LINEAR || — || align=right | 2.1 km || 
|-id=923 bgcolor=#E9E9E9
| 44923 ||  || — || November 3, 1999 || Socorro || LINEAR || — || align=right | 7.8 km || 
|-id=924 bgcolor=#E9E9E9
| 44924 ||  || — || November 3, 1999 || Socorro || LINEAR || — || align=right | 4.3 km || 
|-id=925 bgcolor=#fefefe
| 44925 ||  || — || November 3, 1999 || Socorro || LINEAR || NYS || align=right | 2.2 km || 
|-id=926 bgcolor=#E9E9E9
| 44926 ||  || — || November 3, 1999 || Socorro || LINEAR || — || align=right | 2.7 km || 
|-id=927 bgcolor=#fefefe
| 44927 ||  || — || November 3, 1999 || Socorro || LINEAR || FLO || align=right | 2.3 km || 
|-id=928 bgcolor=#fefefe
| 44928 ||  || — || November 3, 1999 || Socorro || LINEAR || — || align=right | 2.1 km || 
|-id=929 bgcolor=#E9E9E9
| 44929 ||  || — || November 3, 1999 || Socorro || LINEAR || WAT || align=right | 5.5 km || 
|-id=930 bgcolor=#fefefe
| 44930 ||  || — || November 10, 1999 || Socorro || LINEAR || — || align=right | 2.4 km || 
|-id=931 bgcolor=#fefefe
| 44931 ||  || — || November 10, 1999 || Socorro || LINEAR || — || align=right | 2.6 km || 
|-id=932 bgcolor=#fefefe
| 44932 ||  || — || November 5, 1999 || Uenohara || N. Kawasato || FLO || align=right | 2.0 km || 
|-id=933 bgcolor=#fefefe
| 44933 ||  || — || November 4, 1999 || Catalina || CSS || — || align=right | 3.0 km || 
|-id=934 bgcolor=#fefefe
| 44934 ||  || — || November 4, 1999 || Catalina || CSS || V || align=right | 1.5 km || 
|-id=935 bgcolor=#fefefe
| 44935 ||  || — || November 3, 1999 || Socorro || LINEAR || FLO || align=right | 1.7 km || 
|-id=936 bgcolor=#fefefe
| 44936 ||  || — || November 3, 1999 || Socorro || LINEAR || — || align=right | 2.4 km || 
|-id=937 bgcolor=#E9E9E9
| 44937 ||  || — || November 3, 1999 || Socorro || LINEAR || — || align=right | 4.3 km || 
|-id=938 bgcolor=#fefefe
| 44938 ||  || — || November 3, 1999 || Socorro || LINEAR || — || align=right | 2.5 km || 
|-id=939 bgcolor=#E9E9E9
| 44939 ||  || — || November 3, 1999 || Socorro || LINEAR || — || align=right | 3.6 km || 
|-id=940 bgcolor=#fefefe
| 44940 ||  || — || November 3, 1999 || Socorro || LINEAR || V || align=right | 3.8 km || 
|-id=941 bgcolor=#fefefe
| 44941 ||  || — || November 4, 1999 || Socorro || LINEAR || MAS || align=right | 2.1 km || 
|-id=942 bgcolor=#fefefe
| 44942 ||  || — || November 4, 1999 || Socorro || LINEAR || ERI || align=right | 5.0 km || 
|-id=943 bgcolor=#fefefe
| 44943 ||  || — || November 4, 1999 || Socorro || LINEAR || NYS || align=right | 2.1 km || 
|-id=944 bgcolor=#fefefe
| 44944 ||  || — || November 4, 1999 || Socorro || LINEAR || — || align=right | 2.8 km || 
|-id=945 bgcolor=#fefefe
| 44945 ||  || — || November 4, 1999 || Socorro || LINEAR || — || align=right | 2.3 km || 
|-id=946 bgcolor=#fefefe
| 44946 ||  || — || November 4, 1999 || Socorro || LINEAR || — || align=right | 2.1 km || 
|-id=947 bgcolor=#fefefe
| 44947 ||  || — || November 4, 1999 || Socorro || LINEAR || — || align=right | 7.8 km || 
|-id=948 bgcolor=#E9E9E9
| 44948 ||  || — || November 4, 1999 || Socorro || LINEAR || — || align=right | 2.5 km || 
|-id=949 bgcolor=#E9E9E9
| 44949 ||  || — || November 4, 1999 || Socorro || LINEAR || RAF || align=right | 3.1 km || 
|-id=950 bgcolor=#fefefe
| 44950 ||  || — || November 4, 1999 || Socorro || LINEAR || — || align=right | 2.1 km || 
|-id=951 bgcolor=#E9E9E9
| 44951 ||  || — || November 4, 1999 || Socorro || LINEAR || EUN || align=right | 4.9 km || 
|-id=952 bgcolor=#fefefe
| 44952 ||  || — || November 4, 1999 || Socorro || LINEAR || NYS || align=right | 1.6 km || 
|-id=953 bgcolor=#fefefe
| 44953 ||  || — || November 11, 1999 || Xinglong || SCAP || — || align=right | 2.8 km || 
|-id=954 bgcolor=#fefefe
| 44954 ||  || — || November 15, 1999 || Xinglong || SCAP || V || align=right | 2.1 km || 
|-id=955 bgcolor=#E9E9E9
| 44955 ||  || — || November 5, 1999 || Uenohara || N. Kawasato || — || align=right | 6.3 km || 
|-id=956 bgcolor=#fefefe
| 44956 ||  || — || November 3, 1999 || Socorro || LINEAR || — || align=right | 1.8 km || 
|-id=957 bgcolor=#fefefe
| 44957 ||  || — || November 4, 1999 || Socorro || LINEAR || — || align=right | 2.3 km || 
|-id=958 bgcolor=#fefefe
| 44958 ||  || — || November 4, 1999 || Socorro || LINEAR || V || align=right | 1.6 km || 
|-id=959 bgcolor=#fefefe
| 44959 ||  || — || November 5, 1999 || Socorro || LINEAR || — || align=right | 1.6 km || 
|-id=960 bgcolor=#fefefe
| 44960 ||  || — || November 5, 1999 || Socorro || LINEAR || V || align=right | 2.4 km || 
|-id=961 bgcolor=#E9E9E9
| 44961 ||  || — || November 7, 1999 || Socorro || LINEAR || — || align=right | 2.5 km || 
|-id=962 bgcolor=#fefefe
| 44962 ||  || — || November 4, 1999 || Socorro || LINEAR || — || align=right | 2.4 km || 
|-id=963 bgcolor=#fefefe
| 44963 ||  || — || November 4, 1999 || Socorro || LINEAR || V || align=right | 1.1 km || 
|-id=964 bgcolor=#fefefe
| 44964 ||  || — || November 5, 1999 || Socorro || LINEAR || V || align=right | 2.1 km || 
|-id=965 bgcolor=#fefefe
| 44965 ||  || — || November 9, 1999 || Socorro || LINEAR || V || align=right | 1.6 km || 
|-id=966 bgcolor=#fefefe
| 44966 ||  || — || November 9, 1999 || Socorro || LINEAR || NYS || align=right | 4.3 km || 
|-id=967 bgcolor=#fefefe
| 44967 ||  || — || November 9, 1999 || Socorro || LINEAR || NYS || align=right | 4.5 km || 
|-id=968 bgcolor=#fefefe
| 44968 ||  || — || November 9, 1999 || Socorro || LINEAR || — || align=right | 1.7 km || 
|-id=969 bgcolor=#fefefe
| 44969 ||  || — || November 9, 1999 || Socorro || LINEAR || — || align=right | 2.0 km || 
|-id=970 bgcolor=#fefefe
| 44970 ||  || — || November 9, 1999 || Socorro || LINEAR || — || align=right | 3.2 km || 
|-id=971 bgcolor=#fefefe
| 44971 ||  || — || November 9, 1999 || Socorro || LINEAR || NYS || align=right | 2.1 km || 
|-id=972 bgcolor=#E9E9E9
| 44972 ||  || — || November 9, 1999 || Socorro || LINEAR || — || align=right | 3.6 km || 
|-id=973 bgcolor=#fefefe
| 44973 ||  || — || November 9, 1999 || Socorro || LINEAR || MAS || align=right | 1.4 km || 
|-id=974 bgcolor=#fefefe
| 44974 ||  || — || November 9, 1999 || Catalina || CSS || — || align=right | 3.2 km || 
|-id=975 bgcolor=#E9E9E9
| 44975 ||  || — || November 13, 1999 || Catalina || CSS || WIT || align=right | 3.8 km || 
|-id=976 bgcolor=#fefefe
| 44976 ||  || — || November 12, 1999 || Socorro || LINEAR || — || align=right | 2.0 km || 
|-id=977 bgcolor=#E9E9E9
| 44977 ||  || — || November 12, 1999 || Socorro || LINEAR || — || align=right | 6.7 km || 
|-id=978 bgcolor=#fefefe
| 44978 ||  || — || November 14, 1999 || Socorro || LINEAR || — || align=right | 2.4 km || 
|-id=979 bgcolor=#fefefe
| 44979 ||  || — || November 14, 1999 || Socorro || LINEAR || — || align=right | 2.0 km || 
|-id=980 bgcolor=#fefefe
| 44980 ||  || — || November 14, 1999 || Socorro || LINEAR || NYS || align=right | 1.7 km || 
|-id=981 bgcolor=#fefefe
| 44981 ||  || — || November 14, 1999 || Socorro || LINEAR || V || align=right | 2.0 km || 
|-id=982 bgcolor=#fefefe
| 44982 ||  || — || November 14, 1999 || Socorro || LINEAR || NYS || align=right | 3.3 km || 
|-id=983 bgcolor=#fefefe
| 44983 ||  || — || November 14, 1999 || Socorro || LINEAR || — || align=right | 2.8 km || 
|-id=984 bgcolor=#fefefe
| 44984 ||  || — || November 14, 1999 || Socorro || LINEAR || — || align=right | 4.4 km || 
|-id=985 bgcolor=#E9E9E9
| 44985 ||  || — || November 14, 1999 || Socorro || LINEAR || — || align=right | 3.1 km || 
|-id=986 bgcolor=#fefefe
| 44986 ||  || — || November 14, 1999 || Socorro || LINEAR || V || align=right | 1.6 km || 
|-id=987 bgcolor=#fefefe
| 44987 ||  || — || November 14, 1999 || Socorro || LINEAR || — || align=right | 2.2 km || 
|-id=988 bgcolor=#fefefe
| 44988 ||  || — || November 14, 1999 || Socorro || LINEAR || — || align=right | 2.0 km || 
|-id=989 bgcolor=#fefefe
| 44989 ||  || — || November 15, 1999 || Socorro || LINEAR || MAS || align=right | 1.6 km || 
|-id=990 bgcolor=#E9E9E9
| 44990 ||  || — || November 3, 1999 || Anderson Mesa || LONEOS || — || align=right | 5.7 km || 
|-id=991 bgcolor=#fefefe
| 44991 ||  || — || November 12, 1999 || Anderson Mesa || LONEOS || V || align=right | 2.7 km || 
|-id=992 bgcolor=#fefefe
| 44992 ||  || — || November 6, 1999 || Socorro || LINEAR || — || align=right | 2.4 km || 
|-id=993 bgcolor=#fefefe
| 44993 ||  || — || November 6, 1999 || Socorro || LINEAR || FLO || align=right | 1.3 km || 
|-id=994 bgcolor=#E9E9E9
| 44994 ||  || — || November 6, 1999 || Socorro || LINEAR || — || align=right | 2.6 km || 
|-id=995 bgcolor=#fefefe
| 44995 ||  || — || November 15, 1999 || Socorro || LINEAR || — || align=right | 1.9 km || 
|-id=996 bgcolor=#fefefe
| 44996 ||  || — || November 15, 1999 || Socorro || LINEAR || — || align=right | 2.3 km || 
|-id=997 bgcolor=#fefefe
| 44997 ||  || — || November 15, 1999 || Socorro || LINEAR || — || align=right | 3.8 km || 
|-id=998 bgcolor=#E9E9E9
| 44998 ||  || — || November 15, 1999 || Socorro || LINEAR || — || align=right | 3.7 km || 
|-id=999 bgcolor=#E9E9E9
| 44999 ||  || — || November 15, 1999 || Socorro || LINEAR || HEN || align=right | 2.7 km || 
|-id=000 bgcolor=#E9E9E9
| 45000 ||  || — || November 15, 1999 || Socorro || LINEAR || — || align=right | 3.1 km || 
|}

References

External links 
 Discovery Circumstances: Numbered Minor Planets (40001)–(45000) (IAU Minor Planet Center)

0044